= List of educational institutions in Tiruchirappalli =

Tiruchirappalli, often referred to as "Educational Hub", has many centuries-old educational institutions. Among those who graduated from its institutions are Nobel laureate C. V. Raman, Nirmala Sitharaman, Minister of Finance of India, former Presidents of India A. P. J. Abdul Kalam, R. Venkataraman, Sujatha, K. A. P. Viswanatham, and Vanitha Rangaraju.

== Universities ==
- Anna University, Trichy
- Bharathidasan University
- National Institute of Technology, Trichy
- PRIST University, Trichy campus
- Tamil Nadu National Law School
- Indian Institute of Information Technology, Trichy
- Indian Institute of Management, Trichy
- Dhanalakshmi Srinivasan University, Samayapuram, Trichy
- SRM University, Trichy

== Medical colleges ==
- K.A.P. Viswanatham Government Medical College
- Chennai Medical College Hospital and Research Centre (CMCHRC), Tiruchirappalli
- SRM Medical College and Hospital, Trichy
- Dhanalakshmi Srinivasan Medical College, Samayapuram, Trichy
- Krishna Medical College, Irungalur

== Agricultural colleges ==
- Agricultural Engineering College & Research Institute, Kumulur, Trichy
- Anbil Dharmalingam Agricultural College & Research Institute, Trichy
- Horticultural College & Research Institute for Women, Trichy

== Law colleges ==
- Tamil Nadu National Law School
- Government Law College, Trichy

== Business schools ==
- CARE Business School
- Hallmark Business School (HBS), Trichy
- Indian Institute of Management (IIM), Trichy
- Bharathidasan Institute of Management (BIM-Trichy)
- St. Joseph's Institute of Management (JIM)

== Engineering colleges ==
- Jayaram College of Engineering and Technology-JCET
- CARE College of Engineering
- Designed Environment Academy & Research Institute
- Dhanalakshmi Srinivasan Institute Of Technology
- Anna University of Technology, Trichy campus
- Mahalakshmi Engineering College
- M.A.M College of Engineering
- M.I.E.T Engineering College
- MAM College of Engineering and Technology
- Saranathan college of Engineering
- Shivani Institute of Technology
- Shri Angalamman College of Engineering and Technology
- Trichy Engineering College
- K. Ramakrishnan college of Engineering
- Government College of Engineering, Srirangam
- Indra Ganesan College of Engineering
- Pavendar Bharathidasan College of Engineering & Technology
- Oxford Engineering College
- Saranathan College of engineering
- Mookambigai College of Engineering

== Arts and science colleges ==
- Bishop Heber College
- Nehru Memorial College, Puthanampatti
- Jamal Mohamed College
- National College, Trichy
- Periyar E.V.R. College
- St. Joseph's College
- CARE College of Arts and Science
- Srimad Andavan Arts and Science College
- Holy Cross College
- Aiman College of Arts & Science For Women
- Cauvery College for Women
- Urumu Dhanalakshmi College
- Government Arts College, Tiruchirappalli
- Seethalakshmi Ramaswami College
- Shrimati Indira Gandhi College
- M.I.E.T Arts & Science College
- Christhu Raj College

== Polytechnic colleges ==
- Seshasayee Institute of Technology, Trichy
- Government Polytechnic College, Thuvakudi
- Government Polytechnic College, Srirangam
- MIET Polytechnic College, Trichy
- JJ polytechnic college, Ammapettai, Trichy

== Schools and institutions ==
- Seventh-Day adventist Matriculation Higher Secondary School, Beeman Nagar, Trichy -1
- Kamakoti vidyalaya ICSE school
- Santhanam Vidyalaya senior secondary school
- Bishop Heber Higher Secondary School, Teppakulam
- Bishop Heber Higher Secondary School, Puthur
- CSI Methodist Girls Higher Secondary School, Woraiyur
- All Saints Elementary School
- Sri Vageesha Vidhyashram
- Boiler Plant Boys Higher Secondary School
- SBIOA Matriculation and Higher Secondary School, K.K.Nagar
- SBIOA CBSE School, K.K.Nagar
- Arockiamatha Matriculation Higher Secondary School, Karumandapam
- ADAMS MATRICULATION AND HIGHER SECONDARY SCHOOL, AIRPORT, TRICHY
- Aldams School k k Nagar
- Alpha Cambridge International School (IGCSE)
- Alpha Wisdom Vidyashram Senior Secondary School (CBSE)
- Alpha Plus Matriculation Higher Secondary School School (Matric)
- Montfort School, Kattur, Tiruchirappalli (CBSE)
- RSK Higher Secondary School
- Campion Anglo-Indian Higher Secondary School
- Sri Akilandeswari Vidhyalaya, T.V.Kovil, Trichy
- E R Higher secondary school, Trichy
- Higher Secondary School for Boys, Srirangam
- Kamala Niketan Montessori School (CBSE)
- Kendriya Vidyalaya No.1, Ordnance Estate
- Kendriya Vidyalaya No.2, HAPP
- Kendriya Vidyalaya GOLDEN ROCK
- Mount Litera Zee School Trichy
- National School, Trichy
- Rajaji Vidyalaya
- Periyar Centenary Memorial Matriculation Higher Secondary School, KK nagar, Trichy
- Railway Mixed Higher Secondary School, Golden Rock, Tiruchirappalli
- R.C Hr.Sec.School
- St. James Matriculation Higher Secondary School
- St Johns Vestry Anglo Indian Higher Secondary School
- St. Joseph's Anglo Indian Girls Higher Secondary School
- Amirta Vidyalayam school, Erratai Vaikkal, vayalur Road.[CBSE]
- SRV Matriculation Higher Secondary School, Samayapuram
- Akara world school, KK Nagar
- Government ADW Boys Higher Secondary School, KATTUR.
- Vignesh Sri Renga Matriculation Higher Secondary School, Srirangam
