= List of National Institute of Technology Tiruchirappalli people =

This list of National Institute of Technology Tiruchirappalli people is a selected list of notable past staff and students of the National Institute of Technology, Tiruchirappalli.

== Notable alumni ==
=== Academics ===
- Rajkumar Chellaraj, CFO and Associate Dean, Stanford Graduate School of Business, Stanford University
- V. John Mathews, Professor of Electrical Engineering and Computer Science, Oregon State University
- Nagi Naganathan, President, Oregon Institute of Technology
- Krishna Palem, Professor of Computing, Rice University
- S. K. Ramesh, Professor of Electrical and Computer Engineering, California State University, Northridge
- Nagarajan Ranganathan, Distinguished University Professor of Computer Science and Engineering, University of South Florida
- Ramesh R. Rao, Director, Calit2 and Professor of Electrical and Computer Engineering, Jacobs School of Engineering, University of California, San Diego
- Guruswami Ravichandran, Chair of Engineering Division, California Institute of Technology
- Vallabh Sambamurthy, Dean, Wisconsin School of Business, University of Wisconsin, Madison
- Nambirajan Seshadri, Professor of Practice of Electrical and Computer Engineering, University of California, San Diego
- Chetan Sankar, Emeritus Professor, Raymond J. Harbert College of Business, Auburn University
- Venkat Selvamanickam, Professor of Mechanical Engineering and Physics, Director of Texas Center for Superconductivity, University of Houston
- Madhavan Swaminathan, Professor of Electrical and Computer Engineering, Georgia Institute of Technology
- Baba C. Vemuri, Professor of Computer and Information Science and Engineering, University of Florida
- Krishnaswamy Nandakumar, Professor of Chemical Engineering, Louisiana State University
- Suresh Sitaraman, Professor of Mechanical Engineering, Georgia Institute of Technology

=== Business ===
- Jessie Paul, CEO and founder, Paul Writer Strategic Advisory marketing firm
- Mahesh Amalean, Chairman, MAS Holdings
- Natarajan Chandrasekaran, Chairman, Tata Sons and Tata Group
- Rajesh Gopinathan, former CEO and Managing Director, Tata Consultancy Services
- T. V. Narendran, CEO and Managing Director, Tata Steel
- R. Ravimohan, former Executive Director, Reliance Industries; former Chairman and Managing Director, CRISIL
- K. R. Sridhar, CEO and founder, Bloom Energy
- Shyam Srinivasan, CEO and Managing Director, Federal Bank
- Sidin Vadukut, former Managing Director, Mint
- Balaji Sreenivasan, Founder and CEO, Aurigo Software Technologies

=== Arts and entertainment ===
- Esmayeel Shroff, film director and writer
- Satish Chakravarthy, music composer; produces film scores and soundtracks in the Tamil film industry
- Vanitha Rangaraju, Animator, DreamWorks Animation; Technical Lighting Director for Shrek (winner of Academy Award for Best Animated Feature at 74th Academy Awards)
- Preity Mukhundhan, Dancer, Model and an Actress in the Tamil Film Industry.

=== Government, politics and social works ===
- Palanivel Thiagarajan, Minister of Information Technology and Digital Services, Tamil Nadu

=== Scientists ===
- Balu Balachandran, Distinguished scientist, Argonne National Laboratory

== Notable faculty ==
- Rajeev Taranath, Classical musician

== See also ==
- National Institute of Technology, Tiruchirappalli
- Institutes of National Importance
