= List of people from Tiruchirappalli =

The following people were born or based their life in the city of Tiruchirappalli, earlier known as Trichinopoly, in Tamil Nadu, India.

== Arts ==
=== Actor ===
- Alex, Tamil film actor and magician
- S. A. Ashokan, Tamil film actor
- M. K. Thyagaraja Bhagavathar, Tamil film actor
- Bharath, Indian film actor
- Kavin, Tamil television actor and Bigg Boss Tamil 3 contestant
- Napoleon, Indian film actor
- Prasanna, Indian film actor
- Kaka Radhakrishnan, Tamil film actor
- Sivakarthikeyan, Tamil film actor

=== Actress ===
- Anu Hasan, actress and television host
- Vanitha Krishnachandran, South Indian film actress
- T. A. Madhuram, Tamil film actress
- Renuka, Indian film actress
- Yuvarani, Tamil film actress
- Hema Malini, Indian film actress

=== Director ===
- Balaji Mohan, Tamil film director

=== Others ===
- Vanitha Rangaraju, animator, Industrial Light & Magic
- Javar Seetharaman, Tamil writer, playwright and Tamil film actor
- Gunasekaran Sundarraj, miniature artist, social worker

== Music ==
=== Composer ===
- Santhosh Narayanan, Tamil film composer
- T. K. Ramamoorthy, film composer
- G. Ramanathan, film composer
- James Vasanthan, Tamil film composer

=== Singer ===
- Musiri Subramania Iyer, carnatic musician
- Lalgudi Jayaraman, carnatic musician, including composer, singer and violinist
- Srirangam Kannan, carnatic musician
- Krish, playback singer
- Thiruchi Loganathan, Tamil playback singer
- P. Madhuri, playback singer
- T. L. Maharajan, Tamil playback singer
- A. K. C. Natarajan, carnatic musician
- Roshini, playback singer

=== Lyricist ===
- Vaali, Tamil film lyricist, screenwriter

== Literature ==
- V. V. S. Aiyar, Indian independence activist, Tamil writer
- Madhan, cartoonist, journalist, and film critic
- Manushyaputhiran (S. Abdul Hameed), poet, lyricist, publisher
- Samuel Vedanayagam Pillai, Tamil poet, novelist and social worker
- Kalki Sadasivam, co-founder of Kalki magazine
- Sujatha, engineer, Tamil novelist, Tamil film screenwriter

== Military ==
- Valentine Munbee McMaster, British military personnel, recipient of the Victoria Cross
- Mariappan Saravanan, Indian military personnel, recipient of Vir Chakra

== Politics and administration ==
- F. G. Natesa Iyer, Indian National Congress leader from South India, Tamil dramatist
- M. R. Sethuratnam Iyer, former Minister of Development in the Madras Presidency
- T. V. Seshagiri Iyer, Indian lawyer and politician
- T. S. S. Rajan, Indian independence activist, Minister of Public Health and Religious Endowments in the Madras Presidency from 1937 to 1939
- Khan Bahadur P. Kalifullah Sahib Rowther, politician and Dewan of Pudukkottai State from 1941 to 1947
- N.M.Kajamian Rowther, businessman, politician and philanthropist
- K. Subrahmanyam, former strategic affairs analyst of India and journalist
- P. Rathinavelu Thevar, chairperson of the Trichinopoly Municipality from 1924 to 1946 and former vice-president of the Justice Party
- K. A. P. Viswanatham, Tamil scholar, activist and general secretary of the Justice Party until 1940
- Kevin Michel, Western Australian politician representing the electoral district of Pilbara since 2017.

== Science ==
- M. A. Aleem, neurologist and first emeritus professor in neurology from Trichy
- N. Mathrubootham, medical practitioner, counselor and psychiatrist
- C. V. Raman, Nobel laureate in Physics and Bharat Ratna recipient

== Sports ==
- Charles Cornelius, former Indian hockey team goalkeeper and Olympic medallist
- Leslie Fernandez, former Indian hockey team goalkeeper
- Francis Monkland, former English first-class cricketer
- Arokia Rajiv, track and field athlete; specialised in 400 metres
- Rajagopal Sathish, Indian first-class all rounder, captain of Indian World Team in the former Indian Cricket League Twenty20 competition
- Francis Wyatt, former English first-class cricketer

== See also ==
- Lists of people from India by state
