= Thiruverumbur =

Tiruverumbur
- Neighbourhood
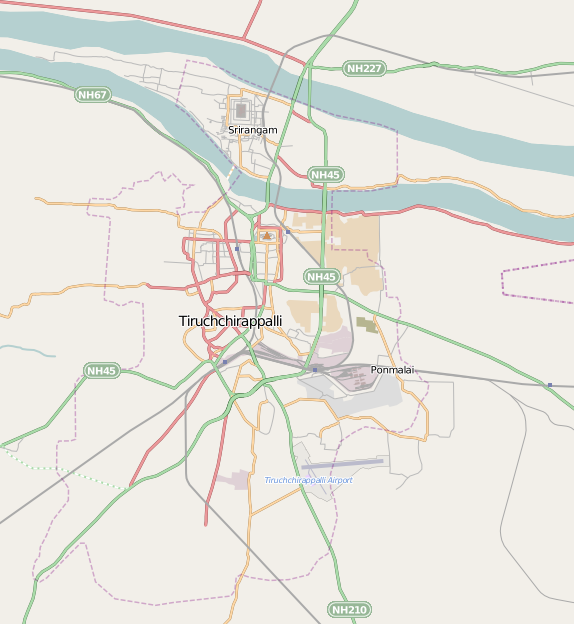
- Thiruverumbur, Tiruchirapalli, Tamil Nadu
- Coordinates: 10°47′06.4″N 78°46′30.0″E
- Country: India
- State: Tamil Nadu
- Elevation: 119 m (390 ft)

Population (2001)
  - Total: 16,835
- Time zone: UTC+5.30 (IST)
- Vehicle registration: TN-81, TN-45 (OLD)

Thiruverumbur (also spelt as Tiruverambur) is a neighbourhood in the city of Tiruchirapalli (Trichy or Tiruchi) in the Indian state of Tamil Nadu. It was merged with the Tiruchirappalli Corporation in 2011.

== Demographics ==
As of 2001 India census, Thiruverumbur had a population of 16,835. Males constitute 50% of the population and females 50%. Thiruverumbur has an average literacy rate of 78%, higher than the national average of 59.5%: male literacy is 84%, and female literacy is 72%. In Thiruverumbur, 11% of the population is under 6 years of age. Formerly a Town panchayat, the town was merged with Tiruchirapalli in 2011.

== Etymology ==
The name of Thiruverumbur is derived from the Lord Thiru Erumbeeswarar whose temple is situated atop a hill near Thiruverumbur.

== Important places ==
- Erumbeeswarar Temple, Malaikkovil.
- Bharath Heavy Electricals Ltd., one of India's major public-sector undertakings (companies in which the central or state governments have a stake).
- Ordnance Factory Tiruchirappalli (OFT) of the Ordnance Factories Board is a production organization run by the Government of India, which produces arms, ammunition, and equipment for the Indian Armed Forces and Police Forces.
- Heavy Alloy Penetrator Project of the Ordnance Factories Board.
- Bharathidasan Institute of Management, Tiruchirapalli, Tamil Nadu state.
- National Institute of Technology, Tiruchirappalli
- Government ITI College, Thiruverumbur
- Jawaharlal Nehru Stadium – Kailasapuram
- Deer Park – Kailasapuram.

== Transportation ==
Bus:- Thiruvermbur is an important bus stop on Trichy - Tanjore National Highway NH 67. Express Buses between Trichy and Tanjore, Kumbakonam, Mayiladuthurai, etc. stop here. Thiruverumbur is also a terminus and important stop for city buses in Trichy.

Train:- Thiruvermbur has a railway station, which is located on the Trichy - Tanjore railway line. Passenger trains via this Trichy-Tanjore route halt here. The express train which currently halts at this station is the Mysore-Mayiladuthurai Express. In the Railway Budget 2012, it has been proposed to upgrade the Thiruverumbur station to an Adarsh Station. Tiruverambur station is a major railway station on the main line and is frequented by a large number of office goers, industrial workers employed in BHEL, its ancillary units, industrial units at SIDCO industrial estate, fabrication units, other small scale units in Ariyamangalam and also by the students of educational institutions. Understanding its importance, the railways had already completed various development works, including construction of shelter in platforms in the Tiruverambur station, foot overbridge, drinking water facility. Air: The nearest airport is Tiruchirapalli International airport for both international and domestic flights.

== RTO ==
The town has a UNIT RTO office with code: TN-81-Z-xxxxunder TIRUCHY (EAST) RTO

== Schools and colleges ==
- Boiler Plant Middle School, Ganesa Bus Stop, Trichy - 14.
- Boiler Plant Boys Higher Secondary School, Kailasapuram, Trichy - 14.
- Boiler Plant Girls Higher Secondary School, Kailasapuram, Trichy - 14.
- Chellammal Matric. Boys / Girls Hr. Sec. School, vengur, Thiruverumbur.
- Chellammal Vidyalaya CBSE School, Vengur, Thiruverumbur.
- Montfort School-Kattur, Trichy-620019
- Government ITI College, Thiruverumbur, Trichy - 13.
- Mukkulathor higher secondary school, Thiruverumbur Bus stand, Trichy - 13.
- R. S. Krishnan Higher Secondary School, Kailasapuram, Trichy - 14.
- BHEL Matriculation Higher Secondary School, Kailasapuram, Trichy -14.
- National Institute of Technology, Tiruchirappalli, Trichy - 15.
- Kendriya Vidyalaya No. 1, Trichy - 16.
- Ordnance Factory High School, Trichy - 16.
- Kendriya Vidyalaya No. 2, Trichy - 25.

== Politics ==
Thiruverambur Assembly constituency is part of Tiruchirappalli (Lok Sabha constituency).
