= Kailasapuram, Tiruchirapalli =

Kailasapuram City in Tiruchirappalli
- Neighborhood in Tiruchirappalli
- Location in Tamil Nadu, India
- Coordinates: 10.779222°N 78.795748°E
- Country: India
- State: Tamil Nadu
- District: Tiruchirapalli
- Established: 1964
- Founder: Kamaraj (Politician)

Government
  - Type: Public sector

Languages
  - Official: Tamil, English
- Time zone: UTC+5:30 (IST)
- PIN: 620014
- Website: www.bheltry.co.in

Kailasapuram is a Neighborhood of the Tiruchirappalli, located 13 km (8 mi) from Tiruchirapalli in Tamil Nadu, India. It contains the manufacturing and housing of Bharat Heavy Electricals Limited (BHEL) as part of BHEL's 3,000-acre (12 km^{2}) Tiruchirapalli Complex.

The township is maintained by civil township department of the company that covers nearly 2500 quarters.

== Location ==
Kailasapuram is about 5 km (3 mi) from Grand Anaicut also known as "Kallanai", which is one of the oldest man made dams in the world, on the river Cauvery.Kailasapuram has its own waterworks in a place called Vengur close to the Kaveri river.

== Facilities ==
=== Housing ===
It is broadly divided into sectors namely A, B, C, D, E, Nehru Nagar, R, PH and K. The PH, Nehru nagar and K are a little away from Kailasapuram and is called Kamarajapuram. There are major shopping centers in A, C, B and K sectors. The quarters are also divided into Type 2,3,4,5,6 and the Executive Directors Bungalow.

=== Roads ===
There are 2 major 4-lane roads in Kailaspuram. The rest of kailasapuram is connected by 2 lane roads.

=== Shopping ===
Shopping centers are available in B, C, E, K and A sectors.

=== Stadium ===
Kailasapuram has a huge stadium called the Jawaharlal Nehru Stadium where the 1989 Ranji Trophy matches were held. A parade function is organised every year on 26 January and 15 August. All schools under BHEL trichy unit and security force of BHEL take part in it. The ED of the unit, gives speeches to the audience including company's highlights with present and future plans associated.

=== Education ===
The leading schools in the area are:

- RSK Higher Secondary School
- Boiler Plant Boys Higher Secondary School
- BHEL Matriculation Higher Secondary School

Kailasapuram also houses the Bharathidasan Institute of Management.

== Transport ==
Kailasapuram is easily accessible by road, rail and air situated just 14 km (9 mi) from the centre of Tiruchirapalli City on the Tiruchi-Thanjavur highway and a short distance from the Tiruverumbur railway station, the township is well connected by road and rail. Tiruchirapalli also has an airport catering to both domestic and international flights.

== In popular culture ==
A Tamil film starring actor comedian Vivek and actress Chaya Singh in the lead was filmed in the location
