= Sitaraman =

Sitaraman may refer to:

== Arts and entertainment ==
- Sita Ramam, a 2022 Indian Telugu-language film

== People ==
- Ganesh Sitaraman, American legal scholar
- Ramesh Sitaraman, Indian American computer scientist
- Suresh Sitaraman, Indian American professor
- Viputheshwar Sitaraman (born 1997), American designer, entrepreneur, and scientist
