= List of National Institutes of Technology alumni =

The National Institutes of Technology (NITs) are a group of engineering colleges in India comprising thirty-one autonomous institution located in one each major state/territory of India.

- List of National Institute of Technology Puducherry alumni
- List of Motilal Nehru National Institute of Technology, Allahabad alumni
- List of National Institute of Technology Raipur alumni
- List of Maulana Azad National Institute of Technology, Bhopal alumni
- List of National Institute of Technology Calicut alumni
- List of National Institute of Technology, Hamirpur alumni
- List of National Institute of Technology, Jamshedpur alumni
- List of National Institute of Technology Kurukshetra alumni
- List of Visvesvaraya National Institute of Technology alumni
- List of National Institute of Technology, Patna alumni
- List of National Institute of Technology Rourkela alumni
- List of National Institute of Technology, Srinagar alumni
- List of Sardar Vallabhbhai National Institute of Technology, Surat alumni
- List of National Institute of Technology Karnataka alumni
- List of National Institute of Technology, Tiruchirappalli alumni
- List of National Institute of Technology, Tiruchirappalli alumni
- List of National Institute of Technology, Warangal alumni
