= Eminence (style) =

Style of reference for high nobility

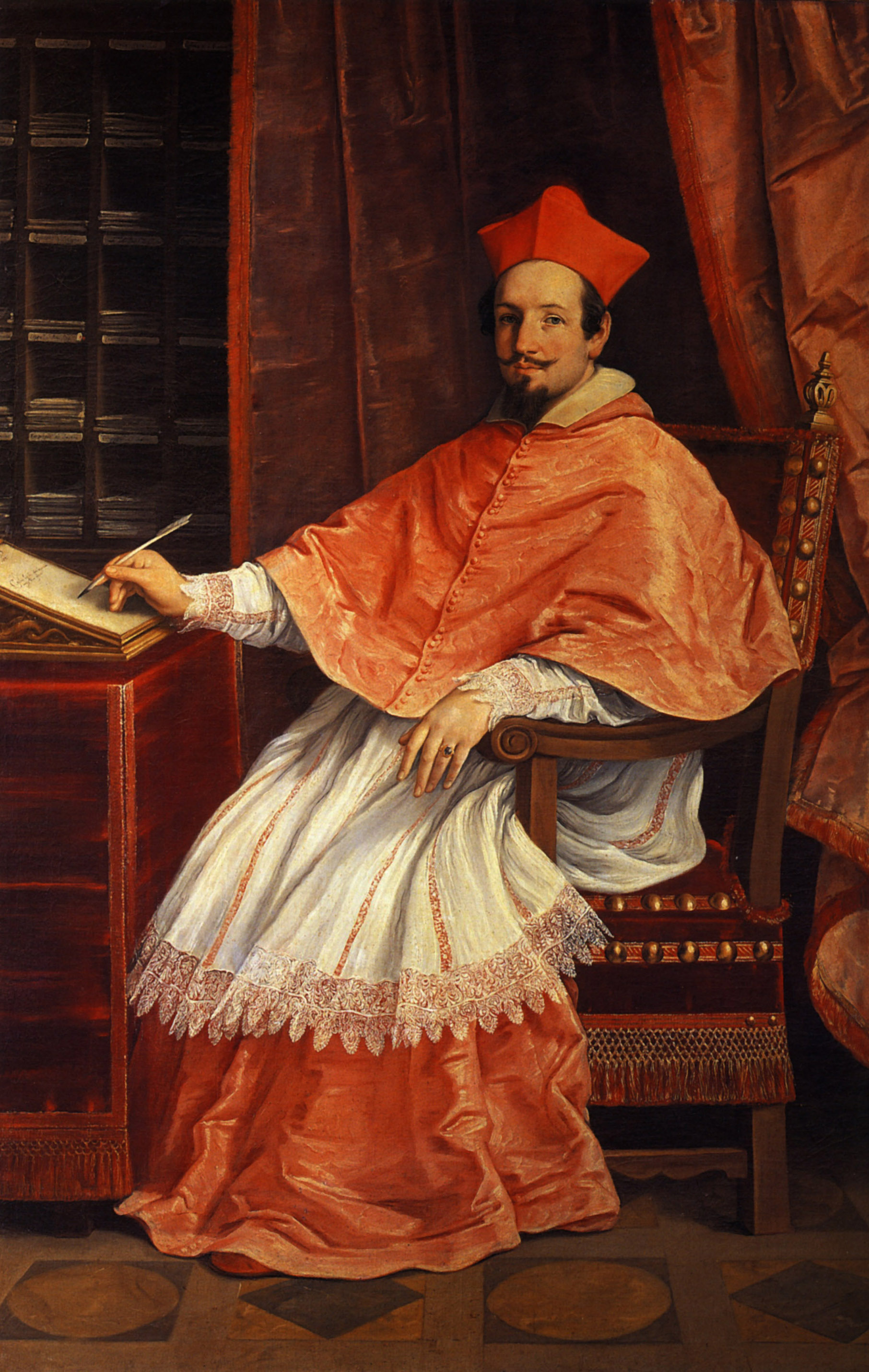
"His Eminence" is a commonly accepted style of reference to refer to a cardinal. (Portrait of Cardinal Bernardino Spada by Guido Reni, c. 1631.)

His Eminence (abbreviated H.Em. or HE) is a style of reference for religious nobility; among others, it is the traditional style to refer to a cardinal.

== Catholicism ==
The style remains in use as the official style or standard form of address in reference to a cardinal of the Catholic Church, reflecting his status as a Prince of the Church.

A longer, and more formal, title is "His [or Your when addressing the cardinal directly] Most Reverend Eminence".

Patriarchs of Eastern Catholic Churches who are also cardinals may be addressed as "His Eminence" or by the style particular to Catholic patriarchs, His Beatitude.

In 1630, the Grand Master of the Sovereign Military Order of Malta was awarded the hybrid style His Most Eminent Highness (abbreviation HMEH) to recognize his status as a type of Prince of the Church, by precedence the most senior official after the most junior member of the cardinals. He had already been made a Reichsfürst (i.e., prince of the Holy Roman Empire) in 1607.

The Prince and Grand Master of the contemporary Sovereign Military Order of Malta is still styled His Most Eminent Highness. Styles such as "His Grand Eminence" or "His Eminent Grace" amongst others were used as well, some formalized by the Pope or other powers, such as monarchs. However, many others were simply the personal preference of the cardinal and by the merit of other earthly offices.

While the term is shunned by many individuals of other faiths or denominations of Christianity, the title is officially maintained in international diplomacy without regard for its doctrinal, philosophical and theological origins.

== Eastern Orthodox Church ==
Archbishops under the Ecumenical Patriarchate (those who are not the primates of autocephalous churches) and metropolitans in the Eastern Orthodox Church are addressed with the style of "Eminence". Archbishops of independent churches are addressed with the style of "Beatitude". Titular metropolitans are addressed with the style of "Excellency".

The Ecumenical Patriarch of Constantinople and the Metropolitan Bishop of Thessaloniki (when they are inside their territorial jurisdictions) are styled "His All-Holiness".

The patriarchs of Alexandria, Antiochia and Jerusalem, as well as the Romanian Patriarch, are referred to as "His Beatitude"., whereas the Serbian, Bulgarian and Russian patriarchs, are referred to as "His Holiness", and the patriarch of the Georgian Orthodox Church is addressed as "His Holiness and Beatitude".

== Oriental Orthodoxy ==
In Oriental Orthodoxy, Archbishops holding the rank of metropolitan are referred to as "His Eminence".

In Syriac Orthodox Church the Catholicos of the East who is also the Maphrian of the East and the Bishop holding the ecclesiastical office of the Catholicos of India is referred to as "His Beatitude Catholicose".

== Other religions ==
In the Philippine Independent Church, an Independent Catholic denomination with Anglo-Catholic orientation, the supreme bishops, who are the church's head primates, are referred to as "His Eminence" and "Your Eminence" in their official form of address or style.

In Tibetan Buddhism and Bön, His Eminence/Your Eminence is the English translation of several Tibetan titles (e.g., Khentin) which signify associate lineage holders and regents of lineages. If the lineage holder of any particular lineage is referred to in English as His Holiness, then the teachers immediately subordinate will usually be accorded the English title His Eminence. For example, in the Karma Kagyu, His Holiness the 16th Gyalwa Karmapa had 4 principal disciples who held regency until the enthronement of the 17th Karmapa. Each of these 4 high lamas hold/held the title His Eminence. In the Southern Drukpa Kagyu in Bhutan, the Five Lopons of the Zhung Dratshang are styled "Their Eminences".

It is also used, often informally (perhaps as a rendering of an oriental style), in Islam for highly honorable religious leaders. For example, an Ayatollah or Marja' in Shia, Imam of the Sunni Barelwi school of thought, Grand Master of the Murjite Order, Moulana Syed Madani Mia, is often addressed with this title, along with individuals such as Moulana Khushtar Siddiqi of Mauritius, although these titles are, in essence, unofficial. Beyond this, the traditional rulers of the sub-national states of the Fulani, Hausa, Nupe and Kanuri peoples of Nigeria use the style as an alternative to the HRH style that is usually used by the country's royal monarchs, highlighting by so doing their positions as spiritual as well as temporal leaders. The Lord of the Rasulid Order is styled His Most Eminent Royal Highness (abbreviated HMERH).

== See also ==
- Ecclesiastical address
- Sua Emittenza, nickname for Italian broadcaster and politician Silvio Berlusconi

Catholic Church	Style
Pope	His Holiness
Cardinal	His Eminence
Bishop	His Excellency
