= Lyndon Jones =

Lyndon Jones may refer to:

- Lyndon Jones (cricketer)
- Lyndon Jones (optometrist)

== See also ==
- Linden Jones, Welsh footballer
