= Erumbeeswarar Temple =

Shiva temple in Tamil Nadu, India

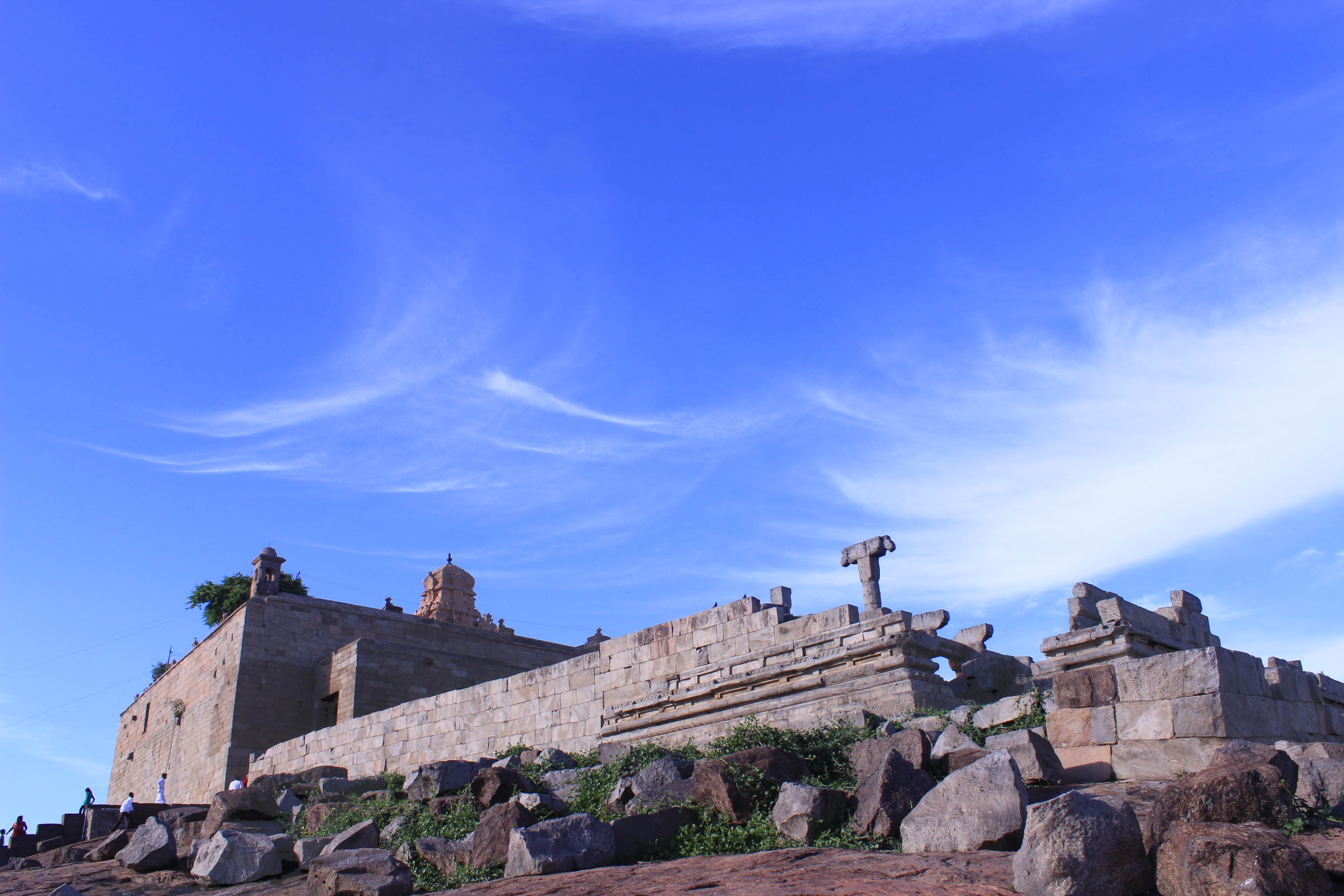
- View from the foothills

- Location in Tamil Nadu

Religion
- Affiliation: Hinduism
- District: Trichy
- Deity: Erumbeeswarar(Shiva) Narun Kuzhal Nayagi (Parvathi)

Location
- Location: Thiruverumbur
- State: Tamil Nadu
- Country: India
- Coordinates: 10°47′34″N 78°46′3″E

Architecture
- Type: Dravidian architecture

Website
- http://erumbeeswararkovil.in

Erumbeeswarar Temple in Thiruverumbur, Tamil Nadu, India, is a Hindu temple dedicated to the deity Shiva. Built on a 60-foot (18 m) tall hill, it is accessible via a flight of steps. The temple's main shrines and its two prakarams (outer courtyards) are on top of the hill, while a hall and the temple tank are located at the foothills. Shiva is believed to have transformed himself into an ant hill and tilted his head at this place to enable ants to climb up and worship him. Erumbeeswarar is revered in the canonical 7th-century Tamil Saiva work the Tevaram, written by Tamil saint poets known as nayanmars and classified as Paadal Petra Sthalam.

The temple is one in a series built by Aditya Chola (871-907 CE) along the banks of river Cauvery, to commemorate his victory in the Tirupurambiyam Battle. It has several inscriptions from the Chola Empire dating back to the 10th century. The temple has been declared a protected monument by the Archaeological Survey of India and is locally referred as "Kailash of South India". The temple is maintained and administered by the Hindu Religious and Endowment Board of the Government of Tamil Nadu.

== Etymology ==
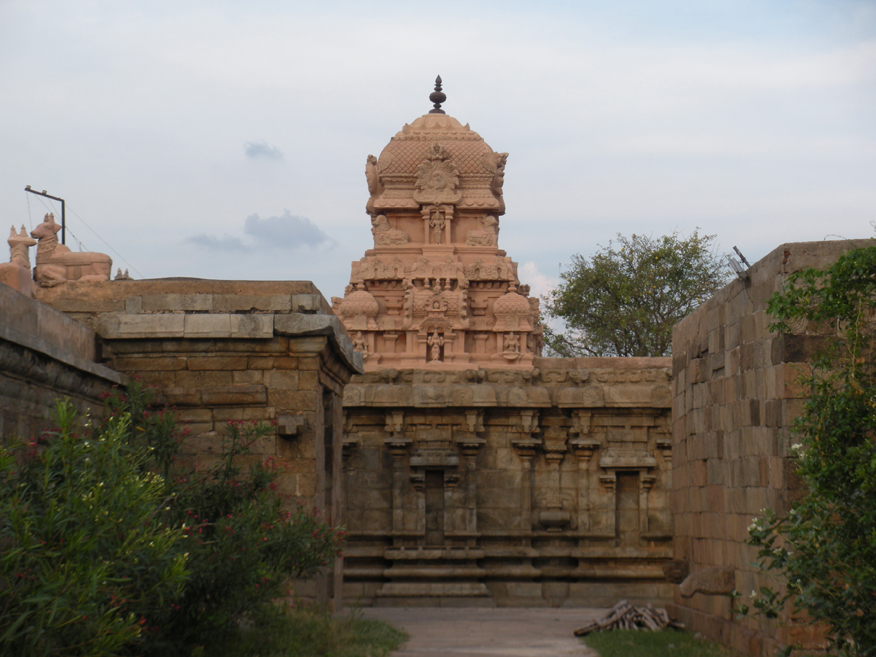
The shrine of Narunguzhal Nayagi Amman inside the temple complex

According to Hindu legend, there lived a demon (asura) Tharukasuran, who conquered Prithvi (earth) and Svarga (heaven). Indra, the leader of celestial deities and other gods suffered at the hands of Tharukasuran and sought the help of the creator-god Brahma, who asked them to worship Shiva in Thiruverumbur. In order to deceive Tharukasuran, the devas transformed into ants and reached the temple. Since the surface of the lingam (aniconic form of Shiva) was slippery, the ants found it difficult to climb up and worship. Shiva transformed himself into an ant hill and slid his head, which enabled the ants to climb and worship. Hence the name Erumbeeswarar is derived from Erumbu meaning ant and Easwaran referring to Shiva. This is one of the three places where Shiva slid his head for his worshippers, the other two being the temples at Virinjipuram and Thiruppanandal. The temple is also referred as Rathinakoodam, Thirverumbipuram, Erumbeesam, Brahmapuram, Laskhmipuram, Madhuvanam, Rathnakoodapuram, Manikoodapuram and Kumarapuram in various religious literature. The temple is locally called as Kailash (the abode of Shiva) of South India.

== History ==
Erumbeeswarar temple in its current form was built by the Chola king Aditya I (871-907 CE). Aditya won a battle in Tirupurambiyam and to commemorate the victory, he built a series of temples along the banks of the river Cauvery. The temple has 49 inscriptions from the Chola period (850-1280 CE). The inscriptions numbered 101, 104, 105, 127, 130 and 133 of 1914 are believed to be inscribed during the 5th to 7th year of the reign of Aditya and hence believed to be between 882 and 885 CE. Another set of inscriptions from the Sundara Chola (957-970 CE) period indicate gift of land to maintain four signs of Tirupadigam. One another inscription indicates the donation of ten kalanchu (a measure) of gold to the deity by a temple woman in the year 875 CE. A king by name Siruthavur Sembian Veithi Velan from Kiliyurnadu is believed to have constructed the vimana (structure over the sanctum). The temple was the only temple that Malik Kafur (1296-1316 CE) could not conquer in 1311 CE, during his South Indian expedition. The temple is a declared monument of the Archaeological Survey of India on account of the inscriptions in the temple. During the war between British and French during 1752, the temple acted as an infantry for the French troops. In modern times, the temple is maintained and administered by the Hindu Religious and Endowment Board of the Government of Tamil Nadu.

== Architecture ==
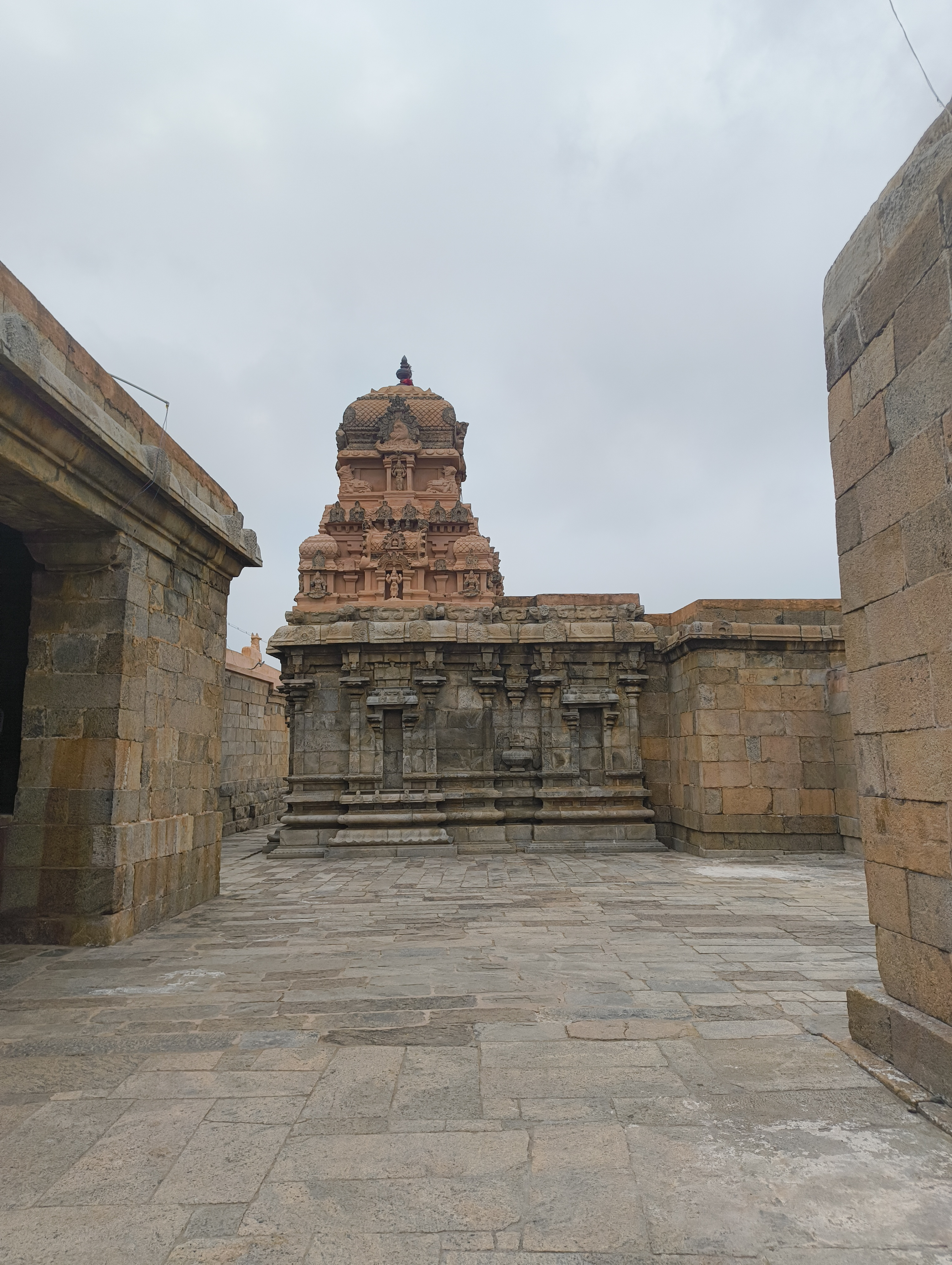
Left side view from the hill-top entrance of Erumbeeswarar Temple located in Thiruverumbur, Trichy.

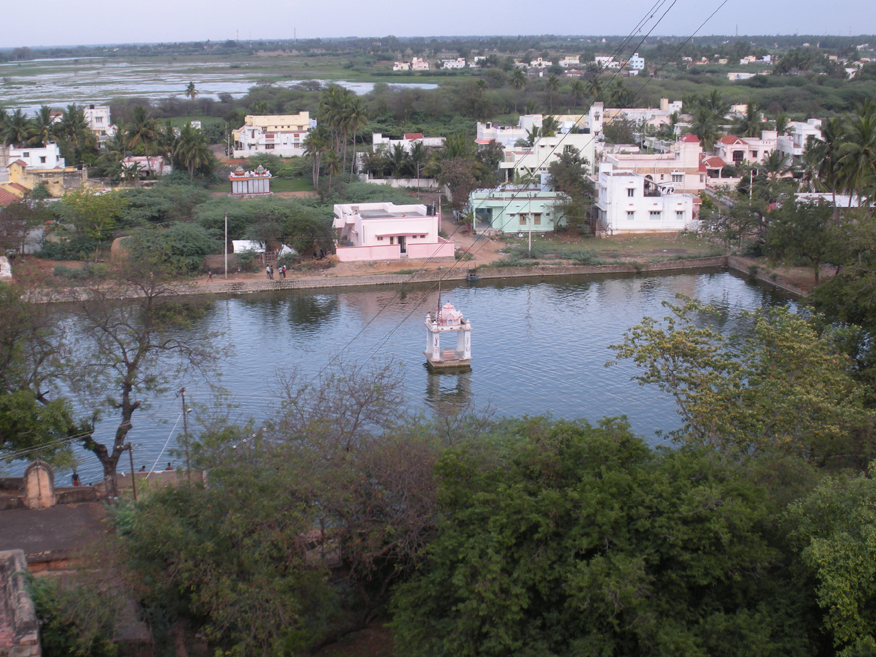
The temple tank in the foothills of the temple

Erumbeeswarar temple is located atop a 60 feet (18 m) hill with a flight of granite steps to the top. Since the temple is atop a hill, it is locally called "Malai Kovil" (meaning hill temple). The temple complex has two prakarams (outer courtyard) and a two-tiered rajagopuram (gateway tower). The central shrine faces east and holds the image of Erumbeeswarar (Shiva) in the form of lingam made of mud mound. The granite images Ganesha (son of Shiva and god of wisdom), Murugan (son of Shiva and god of war), Nandi (the bull and vehicle of Shiva) and Navagraha (nine planetary deities) are in the hall leading to the sanctum. As in other Shiva temples of Tamil Nadu, the first precinct or the walls around the sanctum of Erumbeeswarar has images of Dakshinamurthy (god of knowledge), Durga (warrior-goddess) and Chandikeswarar (a saint and devotee of Shiva). The central image of Erumbeeswarar is made of mud mound and is referred by other names like Erumbeesar, Mathuvaneswarar, Manikoodalachapathi, Piplikesvarar and Manickanathar. The inscriptions in the temple refer Erumbeeswarar as Thirumalai Alwar, Thiruverumbur Alwar and Thiruverumburudaya Nayanar. The shrine of the consort-goddess Narunguzhal Nayagi Amman, facing south, is in the second precinct of the temple. The second precinct is surrounded by granite walls. Narunguzhal Nayagi Amman is referred by other names like Sugantha Kuzhalal, Soundra Nayagi, Madhuvaneswari and Rathnambal.

The path around the foothills, called Girivalam Path, is 20 ft (6.1 m) wide and 900 m (3,000 ft) long. The construction and beautification of the path was carried out by the Tourism department of the government of Tamil Nadu in 2011. The temple has a garden maintained by Bharat Heavy Electricals Limited (BHEL, Trichy).

== .Festivals ==
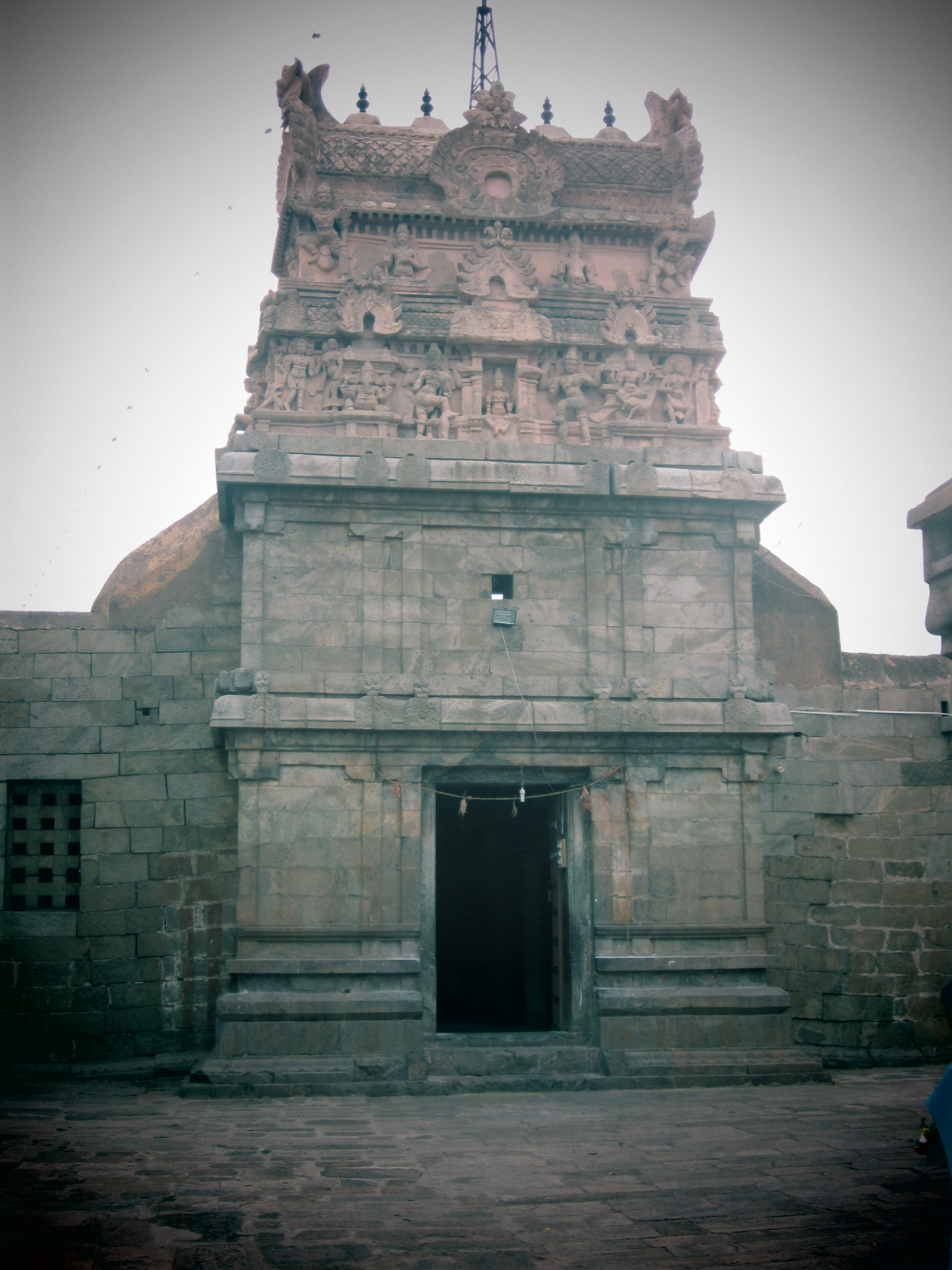
The Rajagopuram - the gateway tower of the temple

The major festival of the temple, the Brahmotsavam, is celebrated during the Tamil month of Vaikasi (May -June). Other festivals include Annabishekam during the Tamil month of Aipasi (October -November), Mahashivaratri and Pournami Girivalam. Every full moon, tens of thousands of pilgrims worship Erumbeeswarar by circumambulating the hill barefoot. The circumambulation covers the circumference of the hill, and is referred as girivalam.

== Literary mention ==
The temple is counted as one of the temples built on the banks of River Kaveri. Appar, a 7th-century Tamil Saivite saint poet and nayanmar, has revered Erumbeeswarar and the temple in his verses in Tevaram, compiled as the Fifth Tirumurai. As the temple is revered in Tevaram, it is classified as Paadal Petra Sthalam, one of the 276 temples that find mention in the Saiva canon. The temple is counted as the seventh in the list of temples in the southern banks of river Cauvery. Appar has glorified the temple in nine poems referring the place as "Erumbiyur" and the deity as "Erubmiyur Eesan", meaning god of Erumbiyur. Manickavasagar, a 9th-century Tamil saint and poet has revered Erumbeeswarar in his work, Thiruvasakam. Tiruverumbiyur Puranam is a religious work that describes the religious history of the temple. Ramalinga Swamigal (1823-74 CE) has revered Erumbeeswarar and the temple in his religious work, Thiruvarutpa.

== Gallery ==
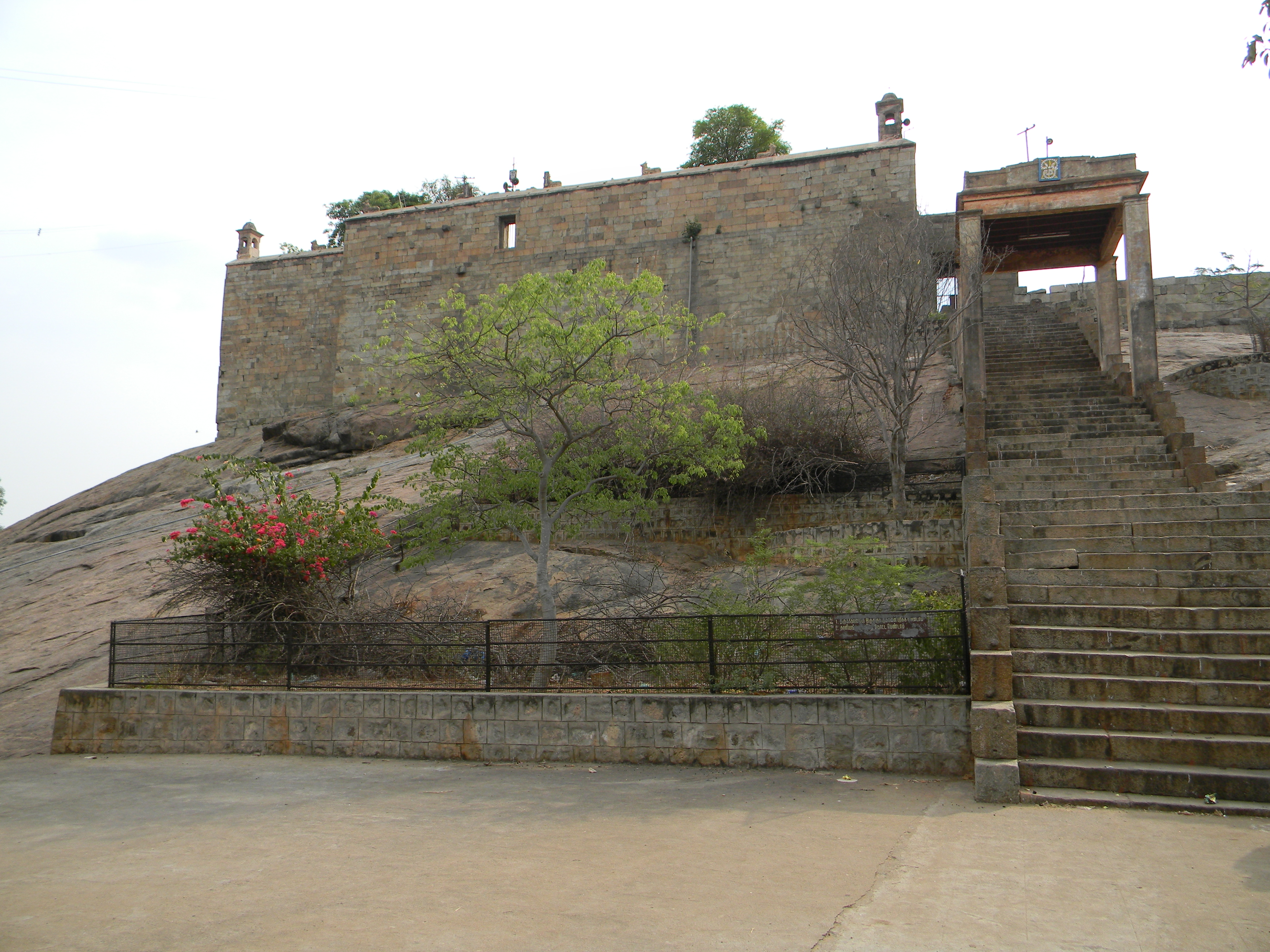
Malaikovil Front View

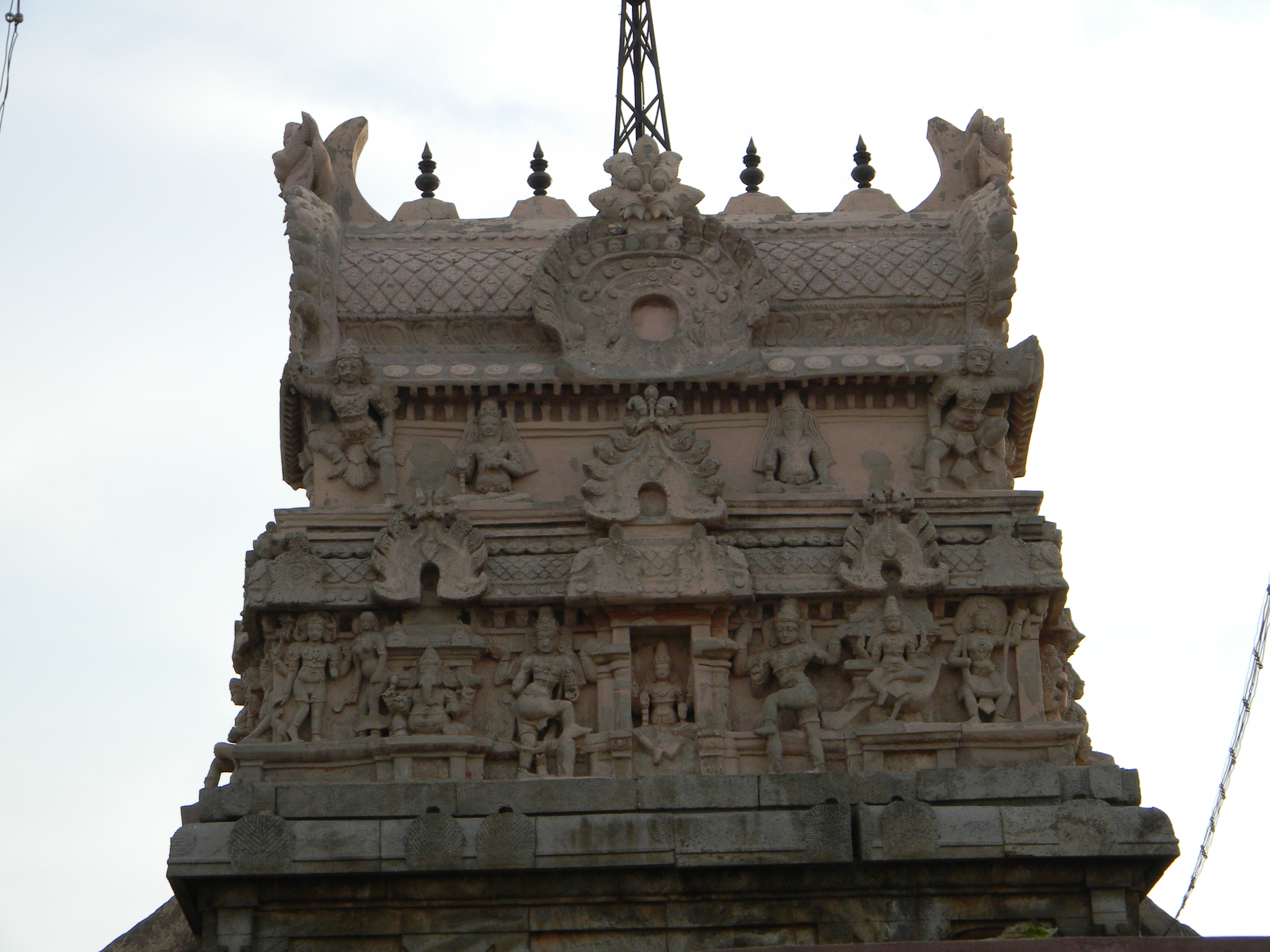
Rajagopuram at Erumbeeshwarar Temple

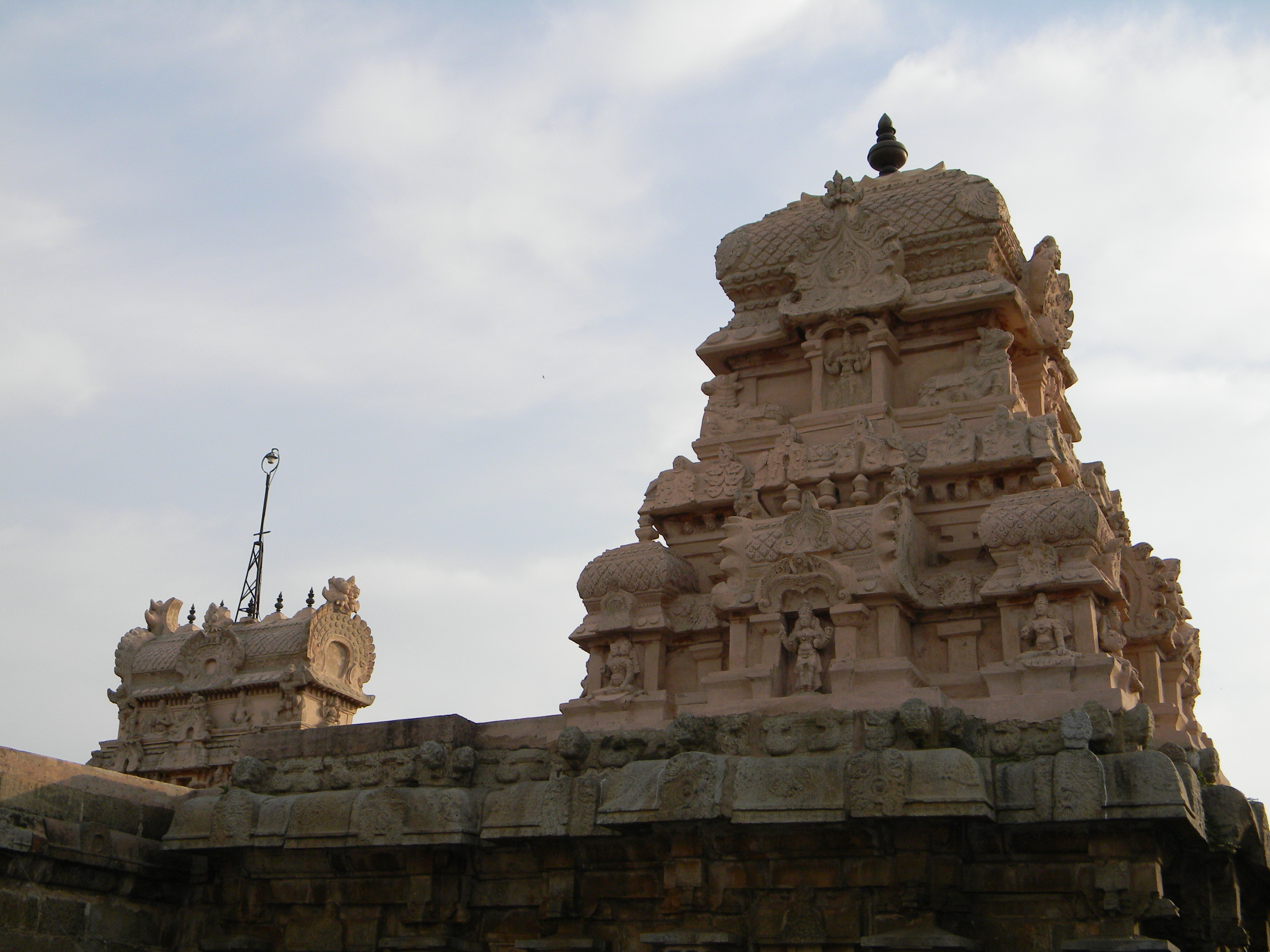
Narungulal Nayagi Amman Gopuram

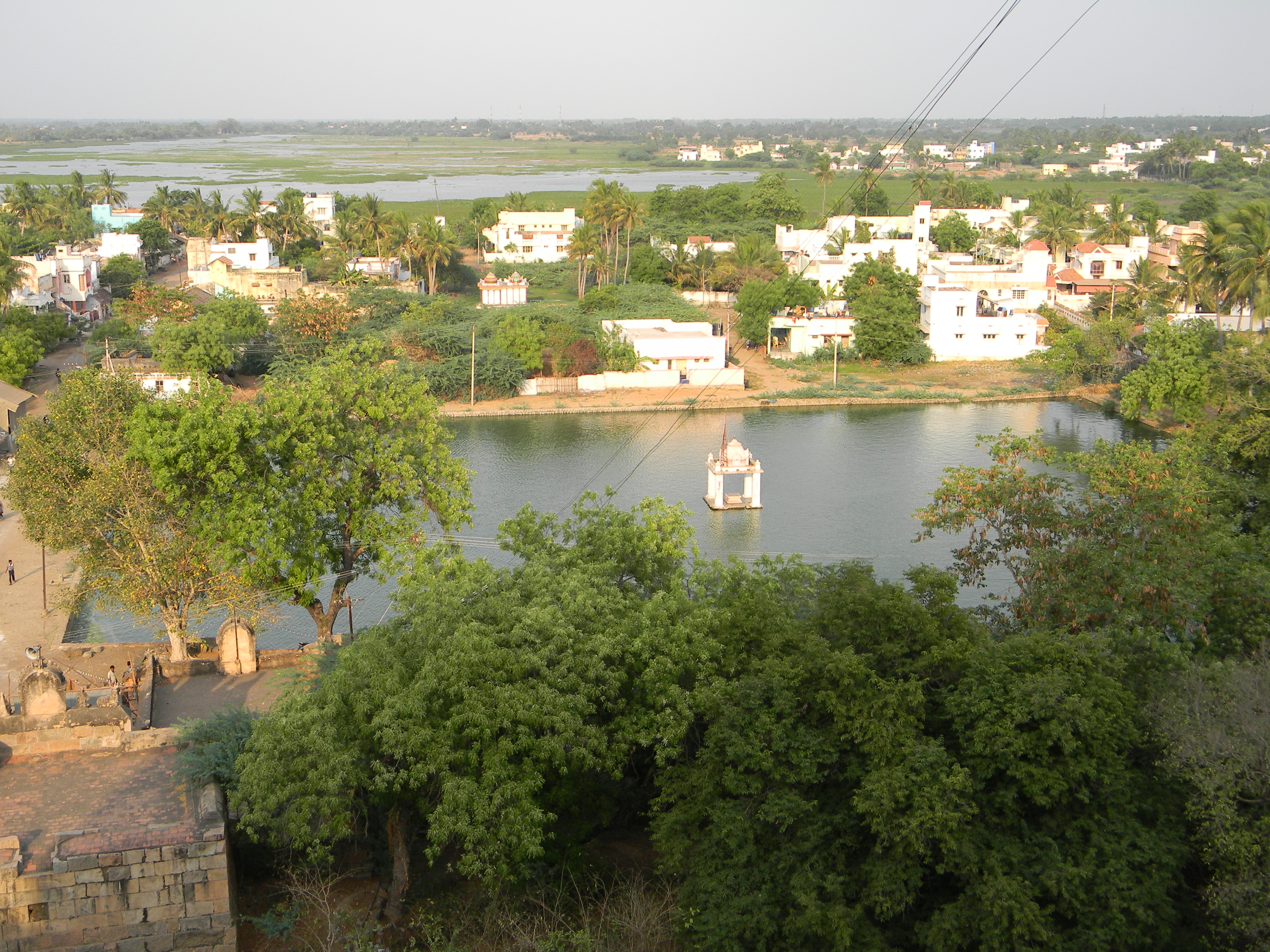
Teppakkulam Top View

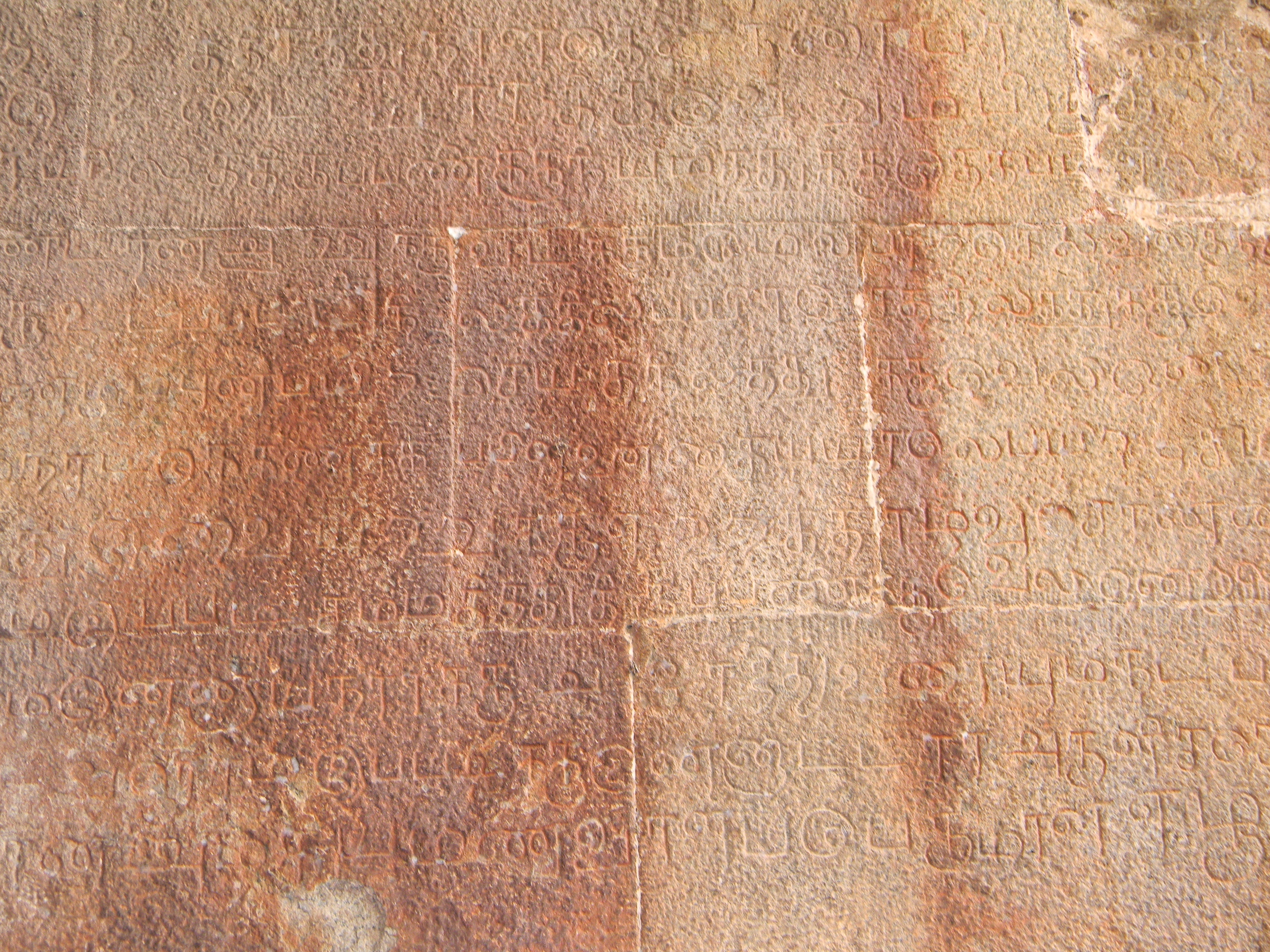
Tamil Sculptures in Erumbeeswarar Temple

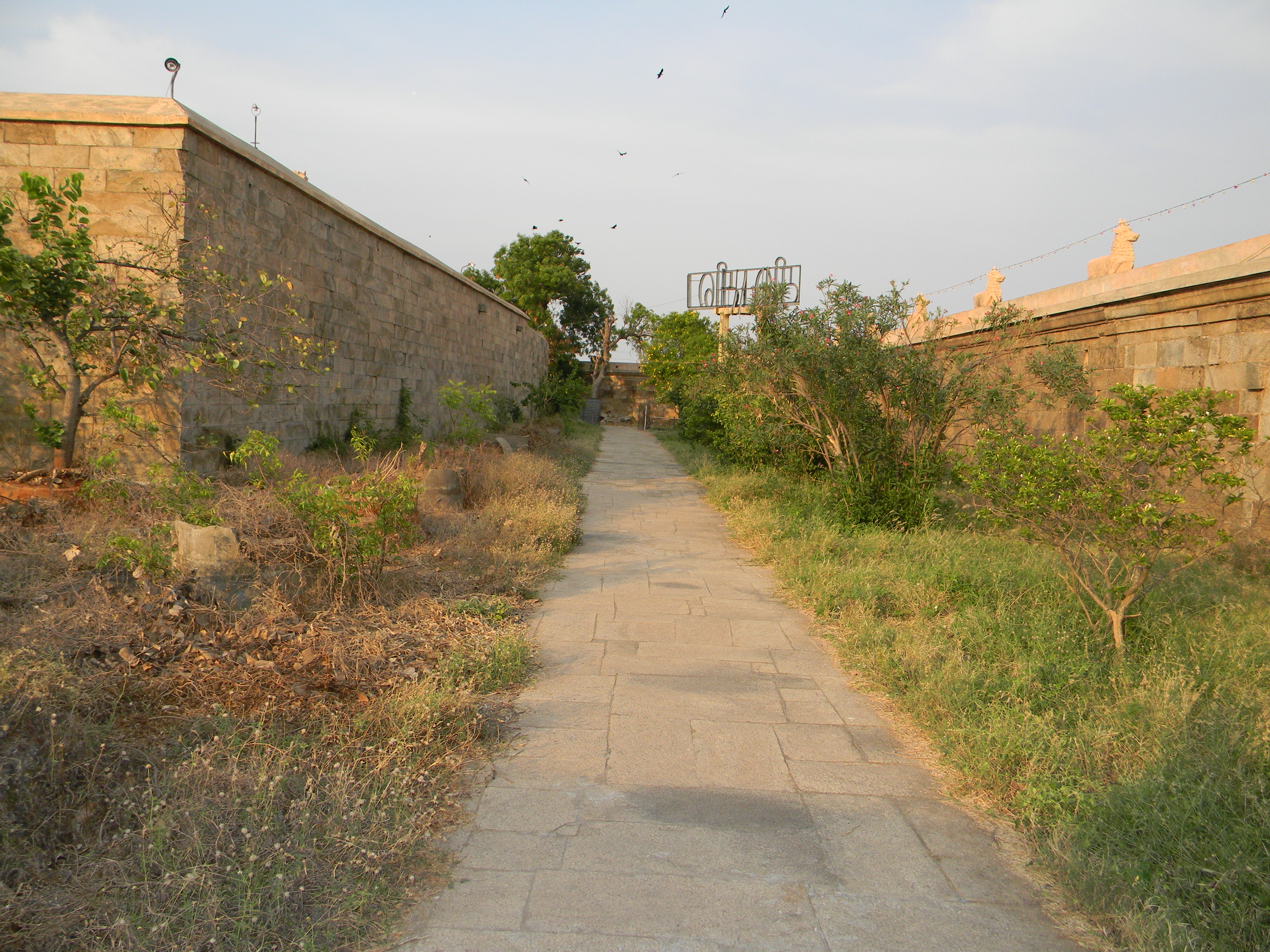
Erumbeeswarar Temple Corridor

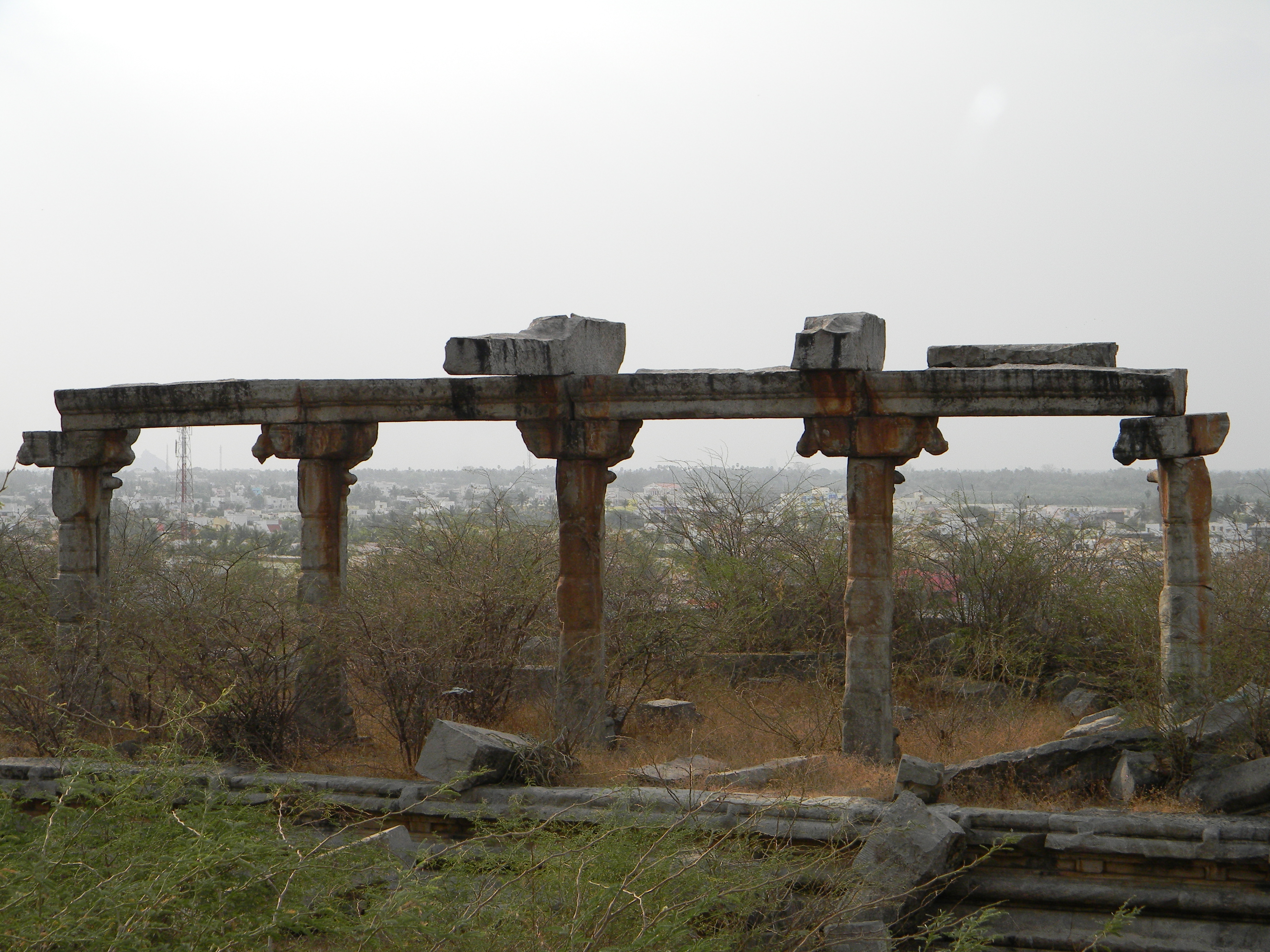
Ruined Area of Erumbeeswarar Temple
