= National College, Tiruchirappalli =

College in Tiruchirappalli, Tamil Nadu, India

National College, Trichy
- Motto: सा विद्या या विमुक्तये (Sanskrit)
- Motto in English: That alone is knowledge which liberates
- Established: 1919; 107 years ago
- Affiliations: Bharathidasan University
- Location: Tiruchirappalli, Tamil Nadu, India
- Campus: Urban
- Website: nct.ac.in

The National College, Trichy is an autonomous institution, located in Tiruchirappalli, Tamil Nadu. It was recognized as the 'College with Potential for Excellence' by the University Grants Commission in 2011. The college is ranked 82nd among colleges in India by the National Institutional Ranking Framework (NIRF) in 2024.

== Academic programmes ==
The college is affiliated to the Bharathidasan University and offers undergraduates and postgraduate programmes in arts and science. It has been accredited by NAAC with an A+ Grade (CGPA 3.61). Academic programmes include Tamil and English Literature, Hindi, Sanskrit, Geology, Mathematics, Physics, Chemistry, Commerce, Management, Statistics, Economics, Philosophy, Botany, Zoology and History.

== History ==
The National College was founded in 1919 under the affiliation of University of Madras. Honourable Prime Minister Shri. Narendra Modi, in his virtual address at the Centenary Celebrations of Visva Bharati University, Shantiniketan, West Bengal, called for the students to evolve into individuals with self-sufficiency (Athma Nirbar) with the knowledge they have. Stating that many educational institutions have served for India's bright future (Ujval Bhavi Bharath), Honorouble Prime Minister also highlighted those 100-year-old educational institutions play a prominent role in Nation-building wherein he mentioned prominent few such as Visva-Bharati University, Banaras Hindu University, Aligarh Muslim University, Mysore University, National College, Tiruchirappalli, Mahatma Gandhi Kashi Vidyapith, and Gujarat Vidyapith. These colleges and universities were established he said during the British rule and continue to serve the student community by imparting knowledge appropriate to transform India into a self-reliant nation. Recently the college commenced its centenary year were as vice president of India M. Venkaiah Naidu inaugurated the centenary celebration. Prominent visitors to the college include Mahatma Gandhi, Jawaharlal Nehru, Rajaji, Annadurai, as well as alumnus, R. Venkataraman, who went on to become President of India.

== Management ==
President

Padmavibushan Dr. Krishnamurthy President of Dr.V.Krishnamurthy Educational Foundation, Chancellor, Indian Maritime University. Chancellor, Central University of Tamil Nadu.

Former positions as Chairman IIM Bangalore, IIM Ahmedabad, IIT Delhi, Xavier Institute of Management.

Former positions as chairman and CEO Bharat Heavy Electricals, Steel Authority of India, Maruti Udyog

Secretary

K. Raghunathan was born on 9 March 1941 to late Dr. R.Kalamegham and K.Kamala at Kumbakonam. K. Raghunathan did his BSc (chemistry) at Jamal Mohamed College and then his BL at Madras Law College and started practice in 1966.

Posts held Past president Rotary Club of Tiruchirappalli, Rock Town Jaycees. Founder president of Trichy District Advocates Association, Life Patron: Trichy District Cricket Association – Institution reached new heights during his tenure

In 2004, when National College Council was trifurcated, he was elected as secretary of Dr V Krishnamurthy Educational Foundation.
