= Lyndon Jones (optometrist) =

British optometrist

- Spouse: Debbie

Academic background
- Education: B.Optom, 1985, University of Wales; PhD, Chemical Engineering, 1998, Aston University
- Thesis: Ocular compatibility of hydrogel contact lenses: deposition and clinical performance. (1998)

Lyndon William James Jones FRSC is a British optometrist.

== Early life and education ==
Jones completed his Bachelor of Optometry from the University of Wales in 1985 and earned his PhD in chemical engineering from the Aston University in 1998. During his time in England, Jones and his wife Debbie ran their own private practice.

== Career ==
Following his PhD, Jones joined the faculty at the University of Waterloo School of Optometry and Vision Science in October 1998. During his early tenure at the school, Jones published a textbook entitled "Common Contact Lens Complications" and was awarded the Peter Abel Contact Lens Award from the German Contact Lens Society. In 2012, Jones was appointed the title of University Research Chair at the School of Optometry and Vision Science. He was eventually appointed director of the Centre for Contact Lens Research and elected a Fellow of the Canadian Academy of Health Sciences. In 2018, he received an honorary degree from Aston University.

In 2020, Jones was promoted to the rank of university professor given in recognition of a researcher "who exemplifies exceptional scholarly achievements and international pre-eminence." The following year, Expertscape recognized Jones as the decade's top contact lens expert and elected a fellow of the Royal Society of Canada.
