= M. A. Aleem =

Indian neurologist

M.A. Aleem
- Born: 1957 (age 68–69); Thuvarankurichi, Tamil Nadu, India
- Education: Thanjavur Medical College Tamil Nadu
- Years active: 1986-present
- Medical career
- Profession: Doctor of Neurology
- Website: drmaaleem.com

M. A. Aleem (M. Abdul Aleem) is an Indian neurologist who is heading K.A.P. Viswanatham Government Medical College, also a former vice-principal of the government medical college Tiruchirappalli(Trichy). Aleem has served more than 28 years in the field of neurology. He was a president of Tiruchi Neuro Association.

Aleem served as executive committee member of Indian Academy of neurology and Neurological Society of India. Dr.MA.Aleem was the vice-principal of K.A.P. Viswanatham Government Medical College. He is also a Consultant Neurologist and Epileptologist ABC Hospital, Trichy

== Early life ==
Aleem was born in Thuvarankurichi did his M.B.B.S. with CRRI from in at Thanjavur Medical College, India. He did his M.D. (Gen. Med.) in 1986 at Thanjavur Medical College. Later, he did his D.M. Neurology at Madurai Madurai Medical College.

== Current Positions ==
Aleem is the Vice Principal, HOD & Professor of Neurology Dept. of Neurology K.A.P. Viswanatham Government Medical College & MGM Govt. Hospital, Tiruchirappalli. He is also a visiting consultant Neurologist & Epileptologist at ABC Hospital Tiruchirappalli.

Aleem was Nominated as Brand Ambassador for Swachh Bharat Mission by The Tiruchirappalli City Corporation on 26 January 2019

== Experience ==
Aleem has a vast experience in the department of Neurology. Started his career as Assistant surgeon in Government of Tamil Nadu Medical services. He worked as a Senior Civil Asst. Surgeon at Thuvarankurichi, Tamil Nadu Medical services. And as a Visiting consultant physician at K.M. Crescent Hospital for more than 11 years. He working as a visiting consultant neurologist & epileptologist at ABC Hospital Trichy. As president of the Tiruchi Neuro Association, he has served as executive committee member in the Indian Academy of neurology and Neurological Society of India.

== Family ==
Aleem's father Mohamed Ibrahim is a business man from Singapore. Aleem's wife Fathima Aleem who is an ex-Chairman of ponnampatti panchayat - thuvarankurichi. They have 2 daughters Jasmine and Salma who have completed their engineering and one Son A.Mohamed Hakkim who is also a doctor by profession.

== Awards ==
1. Lifetime Achievement Award’ by Tamil Nadu Dr. M.G.R. Medical University.
2. Commendation Certificate from district Collector 1989.
3. Junior traveling fellowship award by WFN 2001.
4. Congress attendance award by ILEA Dublin Ireland 2003 to Attend 25th IEA, Lisbon.
5. Travelling Bursary Award ILEA to attend 6th AOCA, Kolalambur - 16.11.2006.
6. Commendation Certificate from district collector 2005.
7. Certificate of Appreciated from district collector 2006.
8. Dr. Banumathy murugananthan award for excellence in medical Publication in Tamil Nadu state IMA Award 2008.
9. Distinguished Alumni Award, Jamal Mohammed College, 2008
10. Republic day award by Tiruchirappalli District Collector - 26.01.2010.
11. Humanitarian Doctor Award by TNMB - 21.01.2010.
12. Dr.Meena Life Time Achievement award by the Global Human Rights Organization 19.02.2011.
13. Lifetime Achievement award by Tiruchirappalli District Minority forum 07.01.2012
14. Certificate of appreciation by Tiruchirappalli Collector – 05.06.2012
15. The man of the year 2012 Award by sanjeevi nagar welfare association Tiruchirappalli on 15.01.2013
