= Mount Tabor Monastery, Pathanapuram =

Monastery in Pathanapuram, India

Mount Tabor Monastery, also known as Mount Tabor Ashram is an Indian Orthodox monastery, in the city of Pathanapuram. It was established in the year 1929 by Thoma Mar Dionysius. The main objectives were promotion of monastic life, starting of educational institutions, opening of Bhavan for the old and children and hospitals, social service and teaching of Orthodox beliefs. There are 47 members in the ashram.

Thoma Mar Dionysius (1929–1972) was the first Superior, since 1972 Catholicate - designate Thomas Mar Timotheos (now Catholicos ) is the superior. Ramban Zacharia (1964–79), Ramban C.T. Isac (1979–80), Ramban T.M. Samuel (1980–92) have served as secretaries. Since 1992 Fr.K.A. Abraham is the secretary.

The Ashram has branches at Pattazhi Maduraimalai, Melam Kulamudie. Kurienayam, Malloor, Podukal- Ramankuth, Mananthavadi- Thondarnadu, Thiruchirapalli Malankara (Tamil Nadu) and Puthenkodu Mathoor (Tamil Nadu).

There is a Boys' Home in Melam Kulanudi and a 100-bed hospital in Mathur, Tamil Nadu, in operation under the Mount Tabor Ashram. Two colleges, one higher secondary school, six high schools, six lower- upper primary schools are run under the supervision of the Ashram.
