= V John Mathews =

Indian-American engineer and educator

- Education: B.E., M.S., PhD
- Alma mater: National Institute of Technology, Tiruchirappalli; University of Iowa
- Occupations: Professor of the School of Electrical Engineering and Computer Science
- Organization: Oregon State University
- Website: https://ipg.oregonstate.edu https://www.mathewsvj.com/

V John Mathews is an Indian-American engineer and educator who is currently a Professor of Electrical Engineering and Computer Science (EECS) at the Oregon State University, United States.

== Early life and education ==
Mathews grew up in India. He obtained Bachelor of Engineering (B.E.) with honors in Electronics and Communication Engineering in 1980 from Regional Engineering College, Tiruchirappalli (now known as National Institute of Technology, Tiruchirappalli), formerly affiliated to University of Madras, India. He then received his Master of Science (M.S.) and Doctorate of Philosophy (PhD) degrees in Electrical and Computer Engineering from the University of Iowa, Iowa City in 1981 and 1984, respectively.

== Career ==
Mathews was a teaching/research Fellow from 1980 to 1984 and a Visiting Assistant Professor in the Department of Electrical and Computer Engineering during the 1984 - 1985 academic year at the University of Iowa. He was with the department of Electrical and Computer Engineering at the University of Utah from 1985 till 2015. He served as the Chairman of the Electrical and Computer Engineering department at University of Utah from 1999 to 2003. He joined the School of Electrical Engineering and Computer Science at Oregon State University in 2015; He was the School Head of EECS from 2015 to 2017. He has also held short-term/visiting appointments at AT&T Bell Labs (1991), IBM T. J. Watson Research Center (2000), Yonsei University, Seoul, Korea (2003-2004), Universidad Carlos III de Madrid, Spain (2016, 2017) and Indian Institute of Science, Bangalore, India (2018).

== Awards and honors ==
- Elected Fellow of the IEEE in 2002 "for contributions to the theory and application of nonlinear and adaptive filtering."
- Recipient of the 2008-09 Distinguished Alumni Award from the National Institute of Technology, Tiruchirappalli, India.
- IEEE Utah Section’s Engineer of the Year Award in 2010.
- Utah Engineers Council’s Engineer of the Year Award in 2011.
- Distinguished Lecturer of the IEEE Signal Processing Society for 2013 and 2014.
- Recipient of the 2014 IEEE Signal Processing Society Meritorious Service Award.

== Research and publications ==
Mathews’ research interests are in nonlinear and adaptive signal processing and machine learning, and their applications in neural engineering, biomedicine, structural health monitoring, audio, and communication systems. He is the author of a book, Polynomial Signal Processing and more than 170 technical papers, and is the inventor on ten patents. He has contributed to the development of adaptive nonlinear filters and performance analysis of adaptive filters. He has developed nonlinear signal processing approaches for image enhancement and mitigation of nonlinear distortions in audio. In recent years, he has focused on neuroprosthetic systems, where he is working on evoking movements in paralyzed limbs via functional neuromuscular stimulation and decoding movement intent of a person from neural and other biological signals. He has also been working on structural health monitoring for detecting and characterizing damage in composite aerospace structures using sensor signals.

== Activities in IEEE Signal Processing Society ==
Mathews has been very active in the IEEE Signal Processing Society (SPS). He was the Vice President (Finance) of the IEEE Signal Processing Society during 2003-2005 and the Vice President (Conferences) of the Society during 2009-2011. As VP-Finance, he inherited a deficit budget from prior years and managed three consecutive years of balanced budgets while allocating substantial resources to improve and increase the Society’s publication activities. As VP-Conferences, he was instrumental in creating reduced conference rate structures for SPS members and student members, as well as working closely with the Publication Board to align the missions of the conferencing and publication activities of the Society. As VP-Conferences, he contributed substantially to the globalization of SPS. The Society’s flagship conferences, IEEE International Conference on Acoustics, Speech and Signal Processing (ICASSP) and IEEE International Conference on Image Processing (ICIP), were held or approved to be held in ten different countries on five different continents during his tenure.

Mathews was elected to the Board of Governors of SPS in 2003. He served as the Chair of the Signal Processing Theory and Methods Technical Committee of SPS during 2015-2016, and as a member of the Fellow Evaluation Committee of the Society during 2017-2019. He has also served on the Conference Board (1996 - 2005, 2009 - 2011, 2016-2018) Publications Board (2003–2005, 2009 – 2011), Technical Directions Board (2016 – 2017) of the Signal Processing Society.

He has served on the editorial boards of the IEEE Transactions on Signal Processing (1989-1991), the IEEE Signal Processing Letters (1993-1998), the IEEE Journal of Selected Topics in Signal Processing (2006 – 2010) and the IEEE Signal Processing Magazine (2005 - 2007, 2012-2014), and was the General Chairman of ICASSP 2001.
