= Catholicos of the East =

Catholicos of the East may refer to:

- Patriarch of the Church of the East
- Maphrian of the East
- Catholicos of India
- Catholicos of the East and Malankara Metropolitan

== See also ==
- List of patriarchs of the Church of the East
