= Rajagopal Sathish =

Indian cricketer (born 1981)

Personal information
- Full name: Rajagopal Sathish
- Born: 14 January 1981 (age 45); Srirangam, Tamil Nadu, India
- Batting: Right-handed
- Bowling: Right-arm medium
- Role: All-rounder

Domestic team information
- Years: Team
- 2000/01–2002/03, 2005/06–2016/17: Tamil Nadu
- 2003/04–2004/05, 2011/12: Assam
- 2010–2011: Mumbai Indians
- 2013: Kings XI Punjab
- 2016: Kolkata Knight Riders

Career statistics
Competition	FC	LA	T20
Matches	33	41	35
Runs scored	1633	807	323
Batting average	37.11	33.62	19.00
100s/50s	5/5	0/2	0/1
Top score	204*	91*	52*
Balls bowled	1588	963	157
Wickets	16	28	3
Bowling average	37.43	26.50	72.00
5 wickets in innings	–	–	–
10 wickets in match	–	–	–
Best bowling	3/18	4/16	1/11
Catches/stumpings	29/-	25/-	18/-
- Source: ESPNcricinfo, 10 October 2011

Rajagopal Sathish (born 14 January 1981) is an Indian former first-class cricketer who played as an all-rounder.

He was captain of the India XI in the Indian Cricket League Twenty20 competition. He played for Tamil Nadu in the Ranji Trophy and for Kolkata Knight Riders in the Indian Premier League.

Satish is a mechanical engineering student at Jayaram College of Engineering and Technology, Tiruchirappalli, and attended Campion Anglo-Indian Higher Secondary School in Tiruchirappalli.
