= Madhavan Swaminathan =

Indian-American scientist

- Born: Tamil Nadu, India
- Education: B.E., M.S., PhD
- Alma mater: Syracuse University; NIT Trichy
- Organization(s): Penn State; Georgia Institute of Technology

Madhavan Swaminathan is the Department Head of Electrical Engineering and is the William E. Leonhard Endowed Chair at Penn State University. He previously worked at Georgia Institute of Technology for 28 years.

== Education ==
He received his Bachelor of Engineering (B.E.) Degree in Electronics and Communication Engineering from Regional Engineering College, Tiruchirappalli (now known as National Institute of Technology, Tiruchirappalli), India in 1985 and Master of Science (M.S.) and Doctorate of Philosophy (PhD) degrees in Electrical Engineering from Syracuse University in 1989 and 1991, respectively.

== Career ==
Madhavan joined Penn State as the head of electrical engineering and William E. Leonhard Endowed Chair in 2023.

Madhavan was the John Pippin Chair in Electromagnetics in the School of Electrical and Computer Engineering and Director of the Center for Co-Design of Chip, Package, System, Georgia Institute of Technology. He formerly held the position of Joseph M. Pettit Professor in Electronics and Deputy Director of the National Science Foundation Microsystems Packaging Research Center, Georgia Techn. Prior to joining Georgia Techn, he was with IBM working on packaging for supercomputers.

Madhavan is the author of more than 450 refereed technical publications, holds 29 patents, also primary author and co-editor of three books (Power Integrity Modeling and Design for Semiconductors and Systems, Prentice Hall, 2007; Introduction to System on Package, McGraw Hill, 2008; and Design and Modeling for 3D ICs and Interposers, WSP, 2013).

== Awards ==
- IEEE Fellow
- Distinguished Lecturer, IEEE EMC Society
- 2014 Outstanding Sustained Technical Contribution Award, IEEE Components, Packaging and Manufacturing Technology Society
- 2014 Distinguished Alumnus Award from National Institute of Technology Tiruchirappalli, India
