= Baba C. Vemuri =

- Education: B.E (Electronics and Communication Engineering), PhD (Electrical and Computer Engineering)
- Alma mater: National Institute of Technology, Tiruchirappalli, University of Texas at Austin
- Occupations: Wilson and Marie Collins Professor of Engineering and Distinguished Professor, Department of Computer and Information Sciences and Engineering, Director of Laboratory for Vision Graphics and Medical Imaging
- Organization: University of Florida

Baba C. Vemuri is the Wilson and Marie Collins Professor of Engineering and a distinguished professor at the Computer and Information Sciences and Engineering Department of the University of Florida. He is also the director of the Laboratory for Vision Graphics and Medical Imaging at University of Florida.

== Education ==
Baba Vemuri received his Bachelor of Engineering (B.E.) degree in Electronics and Communication Engineering from National Institute of Technology, Tiruchirappalli in 1979. He received his MS and PhD degrees in Electrical and Computer Engineering from University of Texas at Austin in 1982 and 1987 respectively.

== Career ==
He was a visiting faculty at IBM T. J. Watson Research Center, Yorktown Heights, New York and visiting research scientist at the German Aerospace Center, DLR, Germany.

His research interests span, High-dimensional Geometric Statistics, Information Geometry, Machine Learning, Computer Vision and Medical Image Analysis. He has published over 200 journal and refereed conference papers in these fields.

== Awards ==
- IEEE Computer Society Technical Achievement Award, for “Pioneering and sustaining contributions to Computer Vision and Medical Image Analysis,” 2017.
- Doctoral Dissertation Advisor/Mentoring Award, Herbert Wertheim College of Engineering, University of Florida, 2015-16.
- ACM Fellow, 2009.
- IEEE Fellow, 2001.
- Distinguished Alumnus Award in 2008 by National Institute of Technology, Tiruchirappalli.
- Whitaker Foundation Award in 1994.
- US National Science Foundation Research Initiation Award (NSF RIA) in 1988.
