= Campion Anglo-Indian Higher Secondary School =

Secondary school in Tiruchirapalli, India

Coordinates: 10.805475°N 78.68449°E

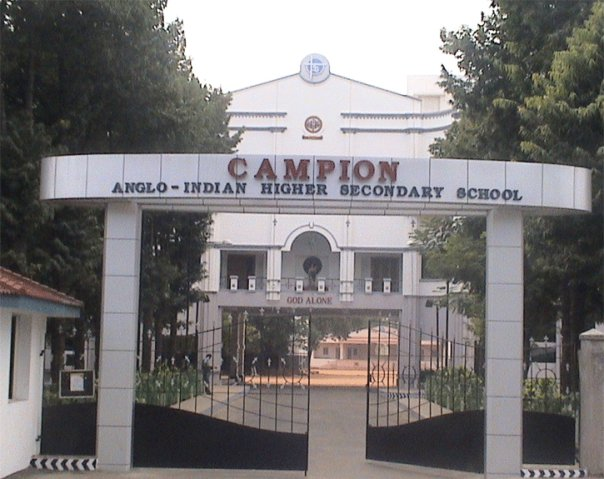
- Main Gate
- 11, Cantonment; Tiruchirapalli 620001; Tamil Nadu; India

Information
- Type: Partly-aided Secondary school
- Motto: Latin: Cur Hic Statis? (Why stand ye here?)
- Religious affiliation: Jesuit
- Patron saint: St. Edmund Campion
- Opened: 5 October 1934; 91 years ago
- Founder: Msgr. Joseph de Rozario
- Principal: James Paul
- Website: www.campiontrichy.com

Campion Anglo-Indian Higher Secondary School was started in the year 1934 at Tiruchirapalli, Tamil Nadu, India. The school is named after its patron saint, St. Edmund Campion. The principal is James Paul.

== History ==
The school was founded in 1934 as a subdivision school to St. Joseph’s European Middle School, which is now St Joseph's Girls' Anglo Indian School. The school owes its existence to the philanthropy of a priest, Mgr. Joseph De Rozario, an Anglo-Indian, who was once a district sessions judge. It was intended for Europeans and Anglo-Indians, but members of other communities are also admitted. The school was initially administered by the Jesuits.

To mark the 25th anniversary of its foundation in 1960, the school constructed a chapel, dedicated to Regina Mundi, the "Queen of the World". In 1970, the school celebrated the canonization, on 25 October 1970, of Edmund Campion, the patron of the school.

At the close of 1972, the Jesuits handed over the management of the school to the owners, the Diocese of Tiruchirapalli. From 1975, the management of the school was taken over from the Diocese by the Brothers of Christian Instruction of St. Gabriel, also known as the Gabrielite Brothers. With the coming of the Montfort Brothers the school witnessed changes and developments of a far-reaching nature. One important development was the upgrading of the school to the higher secondary level. The higher secondary section started in June 1979. A swimming pool and two concrete basketball courts were added to the infrastructure of the school as Diamond Jubilee Memorials in 1994-95.

== Student life and facilities ==
Campion is in the heart of the city on Bharadhidhasan Salai, Cantonment. A student of Campion is called a Campionite.

The school has a mini-zoo, swimming pool and a skating ground. The hostel can accommodate 200 students. There is a mess in the hostel building for the hostelers.

There is a chapel on campus, accommodating 300 people. Mass is conducted every first Friday of every month for students and teachers of Campion. The chapel is open to the public on Sunday and mass is conducted in the morning and evening.

=== Academics ===
There are laboratories for physics, chemistry, computer science and biology. The main computer lab has around 50 systems and the primary block computer lab has 31 systems. There is an audio-visual room with 150-seat capacity where seminars are conducted.

Brother Antony Hall in the hostel building is a 500-seat hall where elocution competitions, fancy dress competitions, dramas and other indoor events take place. Two assembly stages, one in the main block and another in the primary block are present. A canteen is midway between the skating ground and swimming pool.

The Centenary Memorial Building was constructed in 2006, connecting the primary block with the main block. A library is in the main block. The school has a Communication Skills laboratory and a recording studio. There is also a Mathematics lab which aims to reinforce basic Math among students. The centenary building also consists of the Montfort auditorium, it has air condition facility and has a capacity of 300 people, where formal events and meetings are held.

=== Athletics ===
The school has a swimming pool, built in 1996. There is a small pool where primary school students (from LKG to 5th grade) learn swimming and the depth is 2 feet. The depth of the big pool ranges from 4 feet to 9.5 feet. There is a changing room with toilets and bathrooms in the pool premises. In April and May, swimming courses are conducted that are open to the public. District level and state level swimming competitions are held in Campion.

There are four basketball courts, and one of them is indoors. There is a football ground where cricket and hockey are also played. Athletic events and sports day celebrations are conducted in the same ground. An indoor badminton and table tennis courts are in the hostel building. A skating ground is adjacent to the school canteen. There is a sports complex which has a mini gym. A grand pavilion is adjacent to the sports complex where all important functions such as "Campofez," a sports day and school day take place.

== Emblem ==
The patron, St. Edmund Campion, was hanged and the circular rope signifies his martyrdom. The cross inside the circle symbolises sacrifice. The initials of the school — CHS — stand for Cur Hic Statis. The letters DS in the centre is an abbreviation of the motto of the Monfort Brothers — Dieu Seul — means God alone. The school motto cur hic statis means 'why stand ye here?'

== COBA ==
The school has an Old Boys Association COBA (Campion Old Boys Association). The association brings into union and friendship, all former students of Campion Anglo Indian Higher Secondary School, Trichy and fosters and perpetuate their interest and connection with their "Alma Mater".

== Notable alumni ==
- M. Damodaran, former director of Indian Institute of Management Tiruchirappalli and former chairman of Securities and Exchange Board of India
- Major Mariappan Saravanan, military officer who was martyred during Kargil War
- Leslie Fernandez, Indian hockey player
- Sivakarthikeyan, Tamil film actor, singer, and producer
- Vishnu Vishal, Tamil film actor and producer
- Nalan Kumarasamy, film director
- Balaji Mohan, Tamil film director
- Vijay Antony, music director, actor, singer, producer, and financier
- Anand Babu, film actor
- Gajesh, film actor
- Rajagopal Sathish, Indian cricketer, MI/KKR IPL Player
- Krish (singer), singer, actor, Tamil industry
