= Krishnaswamy Nandakumar =

American chemical engineer

- Education: B.E., M.S., PhD
- Alma mater: National Institute of Technology, Tiruchirappalli; University of Saskatchewan; Princeton University
- Occupation: Chair Professor of Chemical Engineering
- Organization: Louisiana State University

Krishnaswamy Nandakumar is the Cain Endowed Chair and Professor of Chemical Engineering at the Louisiana State University, USA.

== Early life ==
He received his Bachelor of Engineering degree from National Institute of Technology, Tiruchirappalli in 1973, Master of Science from the University of Saskatchewan in 1975 and PhD from Princeton University in 1979 all in Chemical Engineering.

== Career ==
Previously he served as the GASCO Chair Professor of The Petroleum Institute in UAE, Visiting Professor of Indian Institute of Science and National University of Singapore, Visiting Scientist of Defence Science and Technology Group in Australia, Chair Professor of South China University of Technology in Guangzhou, China and Editor-in-Chief of The Canadian Journal of Chemical Engineering and International Journal of Nonlinear Sciences & Numerical Simulation. He is also the Elected Fellow of the Chemical Institute of Canada, The Engineering Institute of Canada and the Canadian Academy of Engineering. He received $5.4 million worth research grants.

== Awards ==
He received numerous awards. Some of them are:

- Albright & Wilson Americas Award - 1991
- ESTAC Award for Meritorious Research, 2000
- The AC Rutherford Award for Excellence in Undergraduate Teaching, 2001
- RS Jane Memorial Award from the Canadian Society for Chemical Engineering, October 2008
- Distinguished Alumni Award from Alma Mater National Institute of Technology, Tiruchirappalli May 2009
