= Shrimati Indira Gandhi College =

- Other names: SIGC
- Established: 1984
- Founders: K. Santhanam
- Academic affiliations: Bharathidasan University
- Principal: S. Vidhyalakshmi
- Location: 369 College Road, Near Chatram, Teppakulam, Tiruchirappalli, Tamil Nadu, 620002, India; 10°49′48″N 78°41′36″E
- Website: sigc.edu

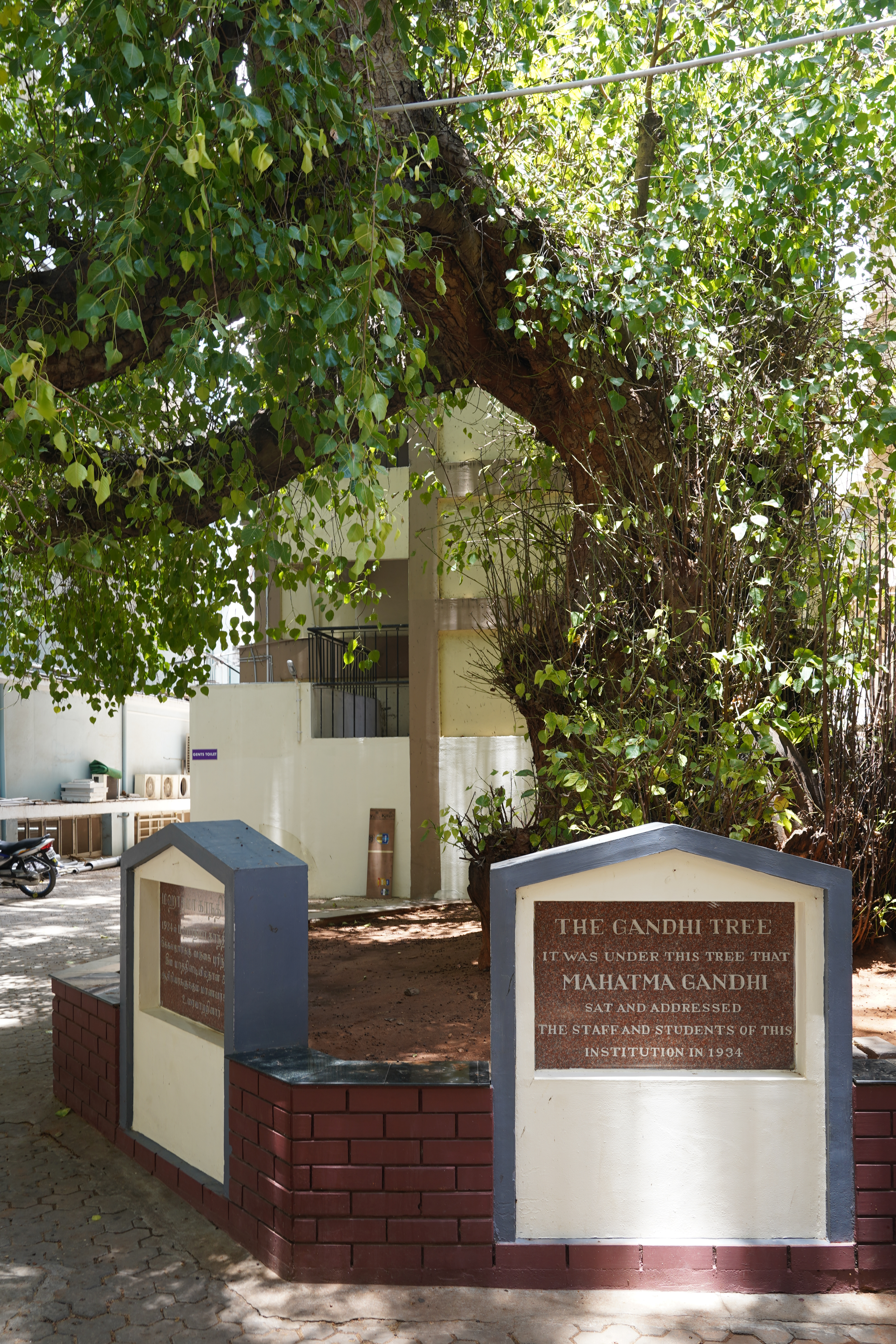
Gandhi Tree: Mahatma Gandhi addressed staff and students here in 1934

Shrimati Indira Gandhi College (also known as SIGC) is a women's college located in Tiruchirappalli, Tamil Nadu, India. The college was established in 1984 by K. Santhanam and is affiliated with Bharathidasan University.

== History ==
K. Santhanam, an educationist, founded the college in 1984. Initially, it offered two courses taught by ten teachers. SIGC is one of the first two colleges in the state established exclusively for women. The college is named after the former Indian Prime Minister Indira Gandhi, and a statue of her is displayed on its grounds.

In 1934, Mahatma Gandhi visited the campus, which was then used by the National College High School. He addressed the staff and students of the school during his visit. A peepal tree, known as "The Gandhi Tree," commemorates the occasion with plaques in English and Tamil. On 16 March 2024, Nirmala Sitharaman unveiled a statue of Mahatma Gandhi at the historic spot under the peepal tree.
