= Mariappan Saravanan =

Indian Army soldier (1972–1999)

Major Mariappan Saravanan VrC
- Born: 10 August 1972; Rameswaram, Tamil Nadu, India
- Died: 29 May 1999 (aged 26); Batalik Sector, Kargil, Jammu & Kashmir State (now in Ladakh), India
- Military career
- Allegiance: Republic of India
- Branch: Indian Army
- Service years: 1995–1999
- Nickname: "Hero of Batalik"
- Unit: Bihar Regiment
- Conflicts: Kargil War †
- Awards: Vir Chakra

Major Mariappan Saravanan (10 August 1972 – 29 May 1999), was an officer in the prestigious Bihar Regiment of the Indian Army who was martyred during the Kargil War. He was killed in hand-to-hand combat with intruders after killing four intruders in the Batalik area of Kargil Sector on 29 May 1999, along with 33 soldiers and four other officers. Saravanan had just completed four years of service on 10 March 1999.

Major Saravanan was possibly the first officer killed in the Kargil War. The attack led by him came in the early stages of the conflict when adequate information was not available. His actions have led to him being referred to as the "Hero of Batalik".

== Early life ==
Born on 10 August 1972 on the island of Rameswaram in the Indian state of Tamil Nadu, Saravanan began his schooling at Kendriya Vidyalaya in Gaya district and continued his high school in Campion Anglo-Indian Higher Secondary School in Tiruchirapalli and later graduated from St. Joseph's College, Tiruchirappalli in 1992. Saravanan was also the president of the student union at st joseph college and was a C certificate holder of NCC. His father Lt. Colonel Adi Mariappan died in a road accident in Bangalore on 19 June 1989 while serving in the Indian Peace Keeping Force during Operation Pawan in Sri Lanka. He has two sisters.

== Military career ==
Saravanan graduated from the OTA in 1995 and joined 1 Bihar as a lieutenant in 1995. After joining the army he was posted to Tamulpur, Cooch Behar and Bhutan before moving to Kargil. He was promoted to captain in 1996 and to major in 1999.

=== The Kargil War ===
1 Bihar was in Assam when the Kargil War broke out. They were ordered to move to Kargil, Jammu and Kashmir. On the night of 28 May 1999, Major Saravanan was assigned the task of capturing a well-fortified Pakistani position at 14,229 feet (4,337 m) in the Batalik sector. He and his men launched an attack at 04:00 IST. Despite intensive firing from the enemy with artillery and automatic weapons, they charged into a volley of bullets. Saravanan fired a rocket launcher into the enemy position that killed two enemy soldiers. During the combat, he was hit by shrapnel and injured but continued fighting. His commanding officer ordered him to retreat because too many Indian soldiers had been injured. He killed two more invaders but this time he was hit by a bullet in the head and died at around 06:30 IST.

=== Vir Chakra ===
The Vir Chakra was awarded to Saravanan posthumously and presented to his mother by President K. R. Narayanan. It reads:

Gazette Notification: 113Pres/98,15-8-99

Operation: –

Date of Award: 15 Aug 1999

Citation:
Major M Saravanan was the Company Commander of one of the companies of 1 Bihar launched in the battalion attack on Point 4268 In the Batalik sector during "Operation Vijay” While moving forward to eliminate the last position held by the enemy, Major Saravanan was fired upon by the enemy with a heavy volume of small arms fire. Unmindful of the enemyfire, he crawled forward to destroy the last remaining enemy position and before being fatally hit by an enemy bullet, killed two enemy soldiers.

Major M Saravanan displayed exceptional bravery, valour and exemplary leadership, fighting from front, destroying two enemy sagars and killing few enemy soldiers before laying his life for the motherland and in the process eliminating an important enemy position.

== Trust and memorial ==
A trust has been created on his name, meant for the welfare of the poor, indigent and needy to serve the society at large without any discrimination as to caste, color and creed. Also, it aims at motivating the youngsters to "Join the Army and serve the nation". Eight years post Kargil war, a memorial was unveiled on the collector office road in Tiruchirappalli. The memorial was constructed and is maintained by Major Saravanan Memorial Trust. On the occasion of Kargil Vijay Divas on 26 July 2008, the Postal Department brought out a special cover in memory of Major M. Saravanan.
