= Vengur =

- Neighborhood
- Interactive map of Vengur
- Coordinates: 10°49′32″N 78°45′13″E
- Country: India
- State: Tamil Nadu
- District: Tiruchirappalli

Population (2001)
  - Total: 1,256

Languages
  - Official: Tamil
- Time zone: UTC+5:30 (IST)

Vengur is a neighbourhood of the city of Tiruchirappalli in Tamil Nadu, India. It is situated in the heart of the city.

== Demographics ==
As per the 2001 census, Vengur had a population of 1,256 with 620 males and 636 females. The sex ratio was 1026 and the literacy rate, 84.33.
