= V. Krishnamurthy =

Indian civil servant (1925–2022)

Venkataraman Krishnamurthy
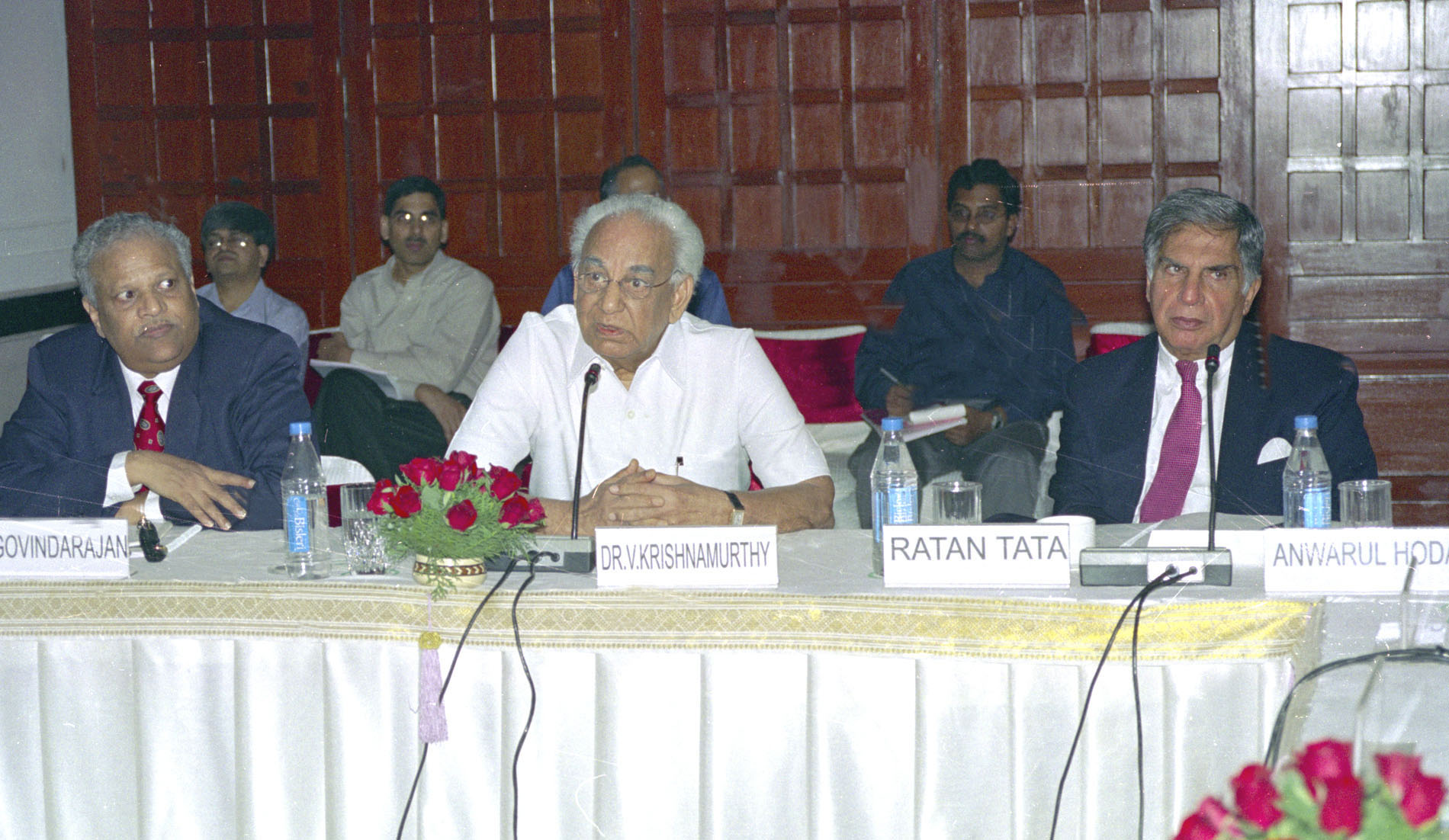
- The Chairman, National Manufacturing Competitiveness Council (NMCC), Dr. V. Krishnamurthy chairing the Second Meeting of NMCC in New Delhi on April 15, 2005.
- Born: 14 January 1925; Karuveli, Madras Presidency, British Raj
- Died: 26 June 2022 (aged 97); Chennai, Tamil Nadu, India

Venkataraman Krishnamurthy (14 January 1925 – 26 June 2022) was an Indian civil servant. V. Krishnamurthy is known as the "Father of Public sector undertakings in India" for his leadership and successful contribution in turning around Bharat Heavy Electricals Limited (BHEL), Maruti Udyog Limited (MUL), Steel Authority of India Limited (SAIL), and GAIL (India) Limited (GAIL) into the most profit making industry in India and globally. He was chairman and CEO of BHEL, MUL, SAIL, and GAIL. He was Chairman of IIM Bangalore and Ahmedabad; IIT Delhi; Xavier Institute of Management, Bhubaneswar; and the Centre for Organization Development, Hyderabad. He has also been Chairman of the Technology Information, Forecasting & Assessment Council. He was Member of the National Advisory Council from 2004 to 2008. Among other positions, he has served as Member, Planning Commission and Secretary to the Government of India in the Ministry of Industry. He was the Chairman of the National Manufacturing Competitiveness Council, holding the rank of a Cabinet Minister up to 2014. He was one of the founding trustees of the Rajiv Gandhi Foundation headed by Sonia Gandhi with Rahul Gandhi, Priyanka Gandhi and other distinguished members as its trustees. He began working with the then Madras Electricity Board in 1944. Later he had the privilege of working directly with India's first Prime Minister Jawaharlal Nehru at the Planning Commission from 1954 in the Second Five Year plan incharge of power projects and then with former Prime Ministers Lal Bahadur Sastri, Indira Gandhi, Morarji Desai, Rajiv Gandhi and Manmohan Singh in various positions in the Government of India.

== Early life ==
V Krishnamurthy was born on 14 January 1925 in the temple town Karuveli. His initial V stands for his father's name Venkataraman. He had two brothers and three sisters –ten year elder brother Subamanian and two year younger brother Vaidyanathan. He married Rajam. He has two sons Jayakar and Chandra. He also had eight year elder sister Janaki Muthukrishnan, elder sister Valambal Venkataraman and younger sister Jayam Ramamurthy.

His grandfather was a wealthy landlord in his village Karuveli, in Thanjavur region. In 1930 due to floods in his village his family lost all the lands. They sold their house and left the village. He went with his mother to live with his uncle. His father went to Chennai to do business. His mother died when he was 11 years old. Because of their poor financial condition, his brothers had to discontinue education and go for employment. His eldest brother joined Southern Railways and another brother joined Kalki magazine as circulation manager.

== Education ==
He did 3 year diploma in electrical engineering from CNT technical Institute in 1943. He passed competitive examination conducted by Union public services commission and joined Central Engineering Services in 1955. He held a Doctorate in Economics from the Soviet Academy of Sciences.

== Career ==
V. Krishnamurthy was the Chairman of the National Manufacturing Competitiveness Council (NMCC) during 2004 – 2014 in the rank of a Cabinet Minister.

He was a member of National Advisory Council during its first tenure.

Member, PM's Council on Trade & Industry.

Member, PM's Trade & Economic Relations Committee.

Member, PM's Energy Coordination Committee.

Member, PM's High Level Committee on Manufacturing.

Secretary to the Government of India in the Ministry of Industry (1977–1980).

Member, Planning commission of India (1991–1992).

Chairman & CEO Bharat Heavy Electricals Limited (BHEL) (1972–1977).

Founder Chairman & CEO Maruti Udyog Limited (1981–1990).

Chairman & CEO Steel Authority of India Limited (SAIL) (1985–1990).

Chairman & CEO GAIL (India) Limited (GAIL) (1985–1990)

Founding Chairman, Technology Information, Forecasting & Assessment Council.

Co-chairman, Indo-Japan Study Committee.

Chairman of National Centre for Promotion of Employment for Disabled People (N.C.P.E.D.P.).

== Academic and professional associations ==
Chancellor, Indian Maritime University.

Chancellor, Central University of Tamil Nadu.

Chairman, Indian Institute of Management Bangalore (1982–1984).

Chairman, Indian Institute of Management Ahmedabad (1985–1990).

Chairman, Indian Institute of Technology Delhi (1990–1993).

Chairman, Xavier Institute of Management, Bhubaneswar (1987–1992).

Member, Board of Governors, Administrative Staff College of India, Hyderabad (1975–1979) & (1990–2022).

== Educational Works ==
=== Bharathidasan Institute of Management ===
In August 1984 Krishnamurthy met with Bharat Ratna, Chidambaram Subramaniam and Professor P. S. Manisundaram, Vice-Chancellor of Bharathidasan University, to develop the idea of establishing a management institute within the grounds of an industrial company. A partnership was signed with Bharat Heavy Electricals Limited, leading to the formation of the Bharathidasan Institute of Management.

== Honors ==
Padma Shri was conferred in the year 1973, for civil services category. This is the Government of India's fourth-highest civilian award.

Padma Bhushan was conferred in the year 1986 for civil services category. This is the Government of India's third-highest civilian award.

Padma Vibhushan was conferred in the year 2007 for civil services category. This is the Government of India's second-highest civilian award.

He is the recipient of " The Grand Cordon of the Order of the Rising Sun" in recognition of his outstanding contributions to the promotion of bilateral economic relations and understanding of Japan in India. H.M. The Emperor of Japan bestowed the Order on 3 November 2009.

He was conferred the Special Nakajima Award by JIPM in the year 2007 for his efforts to promote Total Productive Management (TPM) Initiative in India.

Business Leadership Award In 1975.

Businessman of the Year Award in 1987.

Steelman of the Year Award in 1989.

Lifetime Achievement Award in Management given by AIMA for the Year 2005.

== Personal life and death ==
Krishnamurthy was married and had two children. He died from age-related ailments on 26 June 2022 at his home in Chennai. He was aged 97.
