= K.A.P. Viswanatham Government Medical College =

Medical college in Tamil Nadu, India

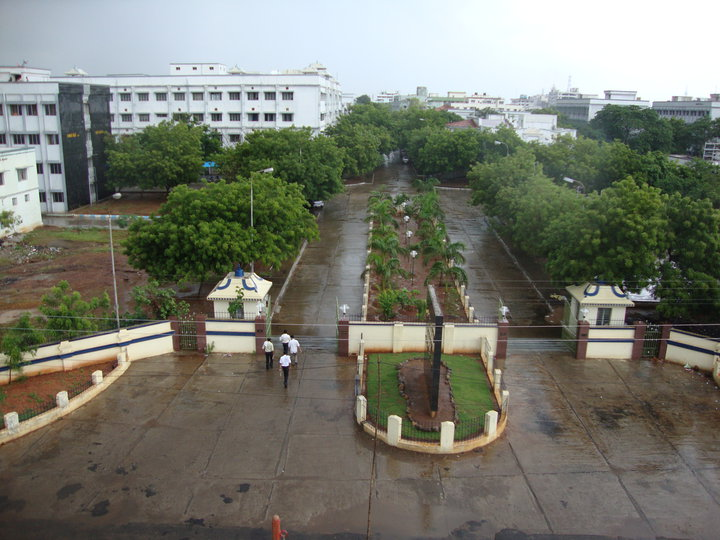
- Motto: Care, Serve, Cure
- Type: Government Medical College and Hospital
- Established: 1997 (29 years ago)
- Affiliations: Tamil Nadu Dr. MGR Medical University
- Dean: Dr. S. Kumaravel
- Management: Department of Health and Family Welfare - Directorate of Medical Education
- Undergraduates: 150 per year (MBBS); 180 per year (BSc Allied Health Sciences Courses)
- Postgraduates: 94 per year (MD&MS) 4 per year (DM)
- Location: Periyamilaguparai, Collector Office Road, Tiruchirappalli., Tamil Nadu, India; 10.797492°N 78.677269°E
- Campus: Urban
- Nickname: KAPVians
- Website: www.kapvgmc.tn.gov.in

K.A.P. Viswanatham Medical College is a medical college started in 1997 and named after famous Tamil scholar K. A. P. Viswanatham. It started with a capacity to accommodate 100 Under graduate students. Since the year 2007, Post graduate courses were also started. Mahatma Gandhi Memorial Government Hospital is attached to K.A.P.V Medical College. It is situated 2 km away from the college campus. It run by the state government of Tamil Nadu, which is recognized by the National Medical Commission. It is located in the city of Trichy, in Tamil Nadu. The college was ranked third by students in counselling in 2010.

== Admission ==
The college admits 150 students to the MB BS course once every year through NEET. Of this 85% is state quota which is allotted by DME of Government of Tamil Nadu and the remaining 15% is All India Quota allotted by MCC of Central Government of Republic of India.

== Facilities ==
The college has more than 30 departments. There are three men's hostels and two women's hostels on campus. It has a stadium that seats 750. There are four lecture halls with over 150 seats. The Central Library is home to over 7,000 books and national and international journals. It has two reading halls, one for masters and the other for professors. There are two indoor and outdoor sports facilities, including a gymnasium, a basketball court, a feather ball stadium, a badminton and two volleyball courts. It also has the ability to play round ball, golf ball, table tennis, soccer and foot ball.

== Courses offered ==
=== Undergraduate Medical Course ===
List of Under graduate courses offered
No	Course Name	No of Seats per year	Course Duration
1	MBBS	150	5½ years

=== Allied health sciences courses ===
List of Allied health sciences courses offered
No	Course Name	No of Seats per year	Course Duration
1	BSc Medical Laboratory Technology	20	4 years
2	BSc Cardiac Technology	20	4 years
3	BSc Critical Care Technology	20	4 years
4	BSc Accident & Emergency Care Technology	20	4 years
5	BSc Dialysis Technology	20	4 years
6	BSc Physician Assistant	20	4 years
7	BSc Operation Theatre and Anesthesia Technology	20	4 years
8	BSc Radiography and Imaging Technology	20	4 years
9	B.Optometry	20	4 years

=== Postgraduate Medical Courses ===
List of Post graduate courses offered
No	Course Name	No of Seats per year	Course Duration
1	MD Biochemistry	5	3 years
2	MD Radio -Diagnosis	3	3 years
3	MD Dermato-Venero-Leprology	2	3 years
4	MD Psychiatry	4	3 years
5	MD Anatomy	3	3 years
6	MD Paediatrics	9	3 years
7	MD Forensic Medicine	3	3 years
8	MD Anesthesiology	13	3 years
9	MD Microbiology	3	3 years
10	MD Pathology	6	3 years
11	MD Emergency Medicine	5	3 years
12	MD General Medicine	14	3 years
13	MS General Surgery	16	3 years
14	MS Orthopedics	5	3 years
15	MS Ophthalmology	2	3 years
16	MS Oto-rhino-laryngology	2	3 years
17	MS Obstetrics & Gynecology	9	3 years

=== Super Speciality Courses ===
List of Super speciality courses offered
No	Course Name	No of Seats per year	Course Duration
1	DM Cardiology	2	3 years
2	DM Neurology	2	3 years
3	M.Ch Neurosurgery	2	3 years

=== Diploma Courses ===
List of Diploma courses offered
No	Course Name	No of Seats per year	Course Duration
1	Diploma General Nursing & Midwifery	100	
2	Diploma Medical Laboratory Technology	100	
3	Diploma Radiodiagnosis Technology	20	

=== Technician Courses ===
List of Technician courses offered
No	Course Name	No of Seats per year	Course Duration
1	Emergency Care Technician	20	1 Year
2	Respiratory Therapy Technician	20	1 Year
3	Anaesthesia Technician	35	1 Year
4	Dialysis Technician	20	1 Year
5	Theatre Technician	35	1 Year
6	Orthopaedic Technician	35	1 Year
7	Orthopedics Technician	35	1 Year
8	Home Health Care Diploma Course	10	1 Year
9	EEG / EMG	10	1 Year
10	Multipurpose Hospital Worker	50	1 Year

== See also ==
- List of Tamil Nadu Government's Educational Institutions
- List of Tamil Nadu Government's Medical Colleges
