= Balu Balachandran =

Distinguished Fellow and Group Leader for Ceramics and Covetic Materials

- Born: India
- Citizenship: American
- Education: B.E., M.S., PhD
- Alma mater: National Institute of Technology, Tiruchirappalli; Indian Institute of Science; OGI School of Science and Engineering
- Organization: Argonne National Laboratory

Balu Balachandran is a Distinguished Fellow and the Group Leader for the Ceramics and Covetic Materials group in the Applied Materials Division at Argonne National Laboratory, Chicago, USA.

== Education ==
He received his Bachelor of Engineering (BE) degree in Metallurgical Engineering in 1975 from National Institute of Technology, Tiruchirappalli, Master of Science (MS) in Metallurgical Engineering from Indian Institute of Science and Doctor of Philosophy (PhD) in Materials Science and Engineering in 1980 from OGI School of Science and Engineering, Oregon, USA.

== Awards ==
Dr. Balachandran received many awards and recognition:

- 2014, Argonne Distinguished Fellow
- 2014, Distinguished Alumni Award, National Institute of Technology, Tiruchirappalli
- 2006, Fellow, Institute of Physics
- 1999, Fellow of the American Ceramic Society
- 1996, University of Chicago’s Distinguished Performance Award
- R&D 100 Awards – Four Awards (The R&D 100 Awards are internationally recognized as the “Oscars of Innovation.” They have been awarded for the best high-technology inventions in a given year since 1962).
  - 2011, R&D 100 Award for the development of advanced ceramic capacitors for power inverters
  - 2004, R&D 100 Award for the development of hydrogen transport membranes
  - 1995, R&D 100 Award for developing dense ceramic membranes for natural gas conversion
  - 1993, R&D 100 Award for developing an efficient new production process for high-Tc powders
- Federal Laboratory Consortium (FLC) Awards for Excellence in Technology Transfer – Two Awards (Awards given by FLC for transferring technology to industry)
  - 1996, Award for Excellence in Tech Transfer for transferring the process to manufacture phase-pure high-Tc powders to industry
  - 1995, Award for Excellence in Tech Transfer for transferring membrane technology to industry
- FLC Awards of Merit – Two Awards (Awards given by FLC for transferring technology to industry)
  - 1994, Award of Merit for transferring the superconductor powder process
  - 1992, Award of Merit for transferring the cryogenic current lead technology
