= Leslie Fernandez (field hockey) =

Indian field hockey player

Medal record

Men's field hockey

Representing India

Hockey World Cup
Gold medal – first place	1975 Kuala Lumpur	Team

Asian Games
Silver medal – second place	1974 Tehran	Team

Leslie Fernandez is a railway worker and former Indian national field hockey goalie. He served as a goalkeeper in the Indian national hockey team which won the gold medal in the 1975 Hockey World Cup. and he was educated at Campion Anglo-Indian Higher Secondary School in Tiruchirappalli. He blocked Pakistan's winning goal in the final minutes of the game winning India a gold medal. In tribute, he donated it to the church. He lives in Madras currently with his family.
