= Nehru Stadium, Tiruchirappalli =

Stadium in Tiruchirappalli, India

Coordinates: 10.7817°N 78.7930°E

Jawaharlal Nehru Stadium
- Interactive map of Jawaharlal Nehru Stadium
- Full name: Jawaharlal Nehru Stadium
- Former names: BHEL Stadium
- Location: Tiruchirappalli, Tamil Nadu
- Owner: Sports Development Authority of Tamil Nadu
- Operator: Sports Development Authority of Tamil Nadu
- Capacity: 5,000

Construction
- Opened: 1968
- Renovated: 1993

Website
- Profile ESPNcricinfo

Jawaharlal Nehru Stadium (formerly Khajamalai Stadium) is an stadium located in Tiruchirappalli, Tamil Nadu. It's the principal venue for the sport of cricket in the city. Located in the BHEL township, it has hosted three first-class matches since 1968–69. The last match played at this ground was the KS Subbiah Pillai Trophy between Tamil Nadu and Hyderabad during the 1989–90 season.
