= Suresh Sitaraman =

Indian American professor

- Born: India
- Citizenship: American
- Education: Ph.D., The Ohio State University, 1989 M.A.Sc., University of Ottawa, Canada, 1985 B.E., National Institute of Technology, Tiruchirappalli, India, 1982
- Organization: Georgia Institute of Technology

Suresh K Sitaraman is the Regents' Professor and Morris M. Bryan, Jr. Professor of the George W. Woodruff School of Mechanical Engineering, Georgia Institute of Technology, Atlanta, USA.

== Education ==
Dr Suresh Sitaraman received his Bachelor of Engineering (B.E.) degree in Mechanical Engineering from Regional Engineering College, Tiruchirappalli (now known as National Institute of Technology, Tiruchirappalli) affiliated to University of Madras in 1982. He also obtained his Master of Applied Science (M.A.Sc.) degree from the University of Ottawa, Canada in 1985 and Doctor of Philosophy (PhD) from the Ohio State University, USA in 1989.

== Career ==
Sitaraman began at Georgia Institute of Technology in 1995 as an assistant professor. Prior, he was at IBM Corporation.

== Awards ==
He received many awards:

- Distinguished Alumnus Award from National Institute of Technology, Tiruchirappalli
- Thomas French Achievement Award, Department of Mechanical and Aerospace Engineering, The Ohio State University, 2012
- American Society of Mechanical Engineers
  - Applied Mechanics Award, Electronic and Photonic Packaging Division, 2012
  - Fellow, 2004
  - International Congress Symposium Chair, 1997
- Georgia Institute of Technology
  - Sigma Xi (Georgia Tech Chapter) Sustained Research Award, 2008
  - Outstanding Faculty Leadership Award for the Development of Graduate Research Assistants, 2006
  - Packaging Research Center Outstanding Faculty Educator Award, 1998
  - Packaging Research Center Technology Program Award, 1998
- Institute of Microelectronics and Packaging Society
  - International Symposium on Advanced Packaging Materials Best Paper of the Session, 2000 and 1999
- Institute of Electrical and Electronics Engineers (IEEE)
  - Transactions of Advanced Packaging Commendable Paper Award, 2004
  - Transactions on Components and Packaging Technologies Best Paper of the Year, 2001 and 2000
  - Transactions on Compoents, Packaging, and Manufacturing Technology, Associate Editor
- Metro Atlanta Engineer of the Year in Education, 1999
- National Science Foundation Faculty Early Career Development Award, 1997-2002
- National Institute of Standards and Technology Advanced Technology Program Award, 1998
