= Bachelor of Optometry =

Bachelor of Optometry (B.Optom) is a five-year degree programme in the field of optometry, awarded upon graduation from an optometry school under a recognised university. Its curriculum is designed to impart knowledge related to eye and its connected organs, the correction of refractive errors, and the treatment and management of eye diseases. This degree comprises five years of education, including one year of clinical internship at a tertiary eye care center. This degree is the minimum required qualification to be called an optometrist and to practice optometry (which includes tasks like prescribing spectacles, contact lenses, eye medications, etc.) in several countries of the world.

== Countries ==
The degree is awarded by institutions in Australia, Bangladesh, Brazil, India, Nepal, Oman, the United Kingdom, and several other countries.

== About ==
B.Optom is an eye-specific, five-year professional degree that covers all aspects of medical and optical management of the eye, except surgery. Optometrists generally provide primary care, which includes prescription of spectacles or contact lenses to correct refractive errors as well as prescription of eye medications for the treatment of eye diseases. Optometrists also practice at secondary and tertiary levels of eyecare after doing postgraduate (M.Optom) and fellowships in certain specialities such as comprehensive optometry, contact lenses, orthoptics and vision therapy, geriatrics, paediatrics, low vision, ocularistry, etc.
