= R. S. Krishnan Higher Secondary School =

R.S.Krishnan Higher Secondary School

Location
- Kailasapuram, Trichy, Tamil Nadu; India; 10°46′48″N 78°47′36″E

Information
- Type: Coeducation
- Motto: Be Just and Fear Not
- Established: 1964; 62 years ago
- School district: Tiruchirappalli
- Grades: Kindergarten to Grade 12
- Website: http://www.rsk.edu.in/ http://www.rskschool.com/ https://rsk-bheltrichy.davchennai.org/

The R. S. Krishnan Higher Secondary School is located in Tiruchirapalli (Trichy), Tamil Nadu, India.

== Background ==
The school was founded in 1964 by the Bharat Heavy Electricals Limited company to provide education for the children of the company's employees. Subsequently, the school opened admissions for non-BHEL students too. Initially, the school was given the name Boiler Plant Higher Secondary School, and was renamed to be R.S.Krishnan Higher Secondary School, in memory of the first executive director of BHEL. It was run by the Montfort Brothers of St. Gabriel until 2006, when the Singapore-based Global Indian Education Foundation took over the management of the school. R.S.K. was under their preview for a tenure of 5 academic years. From June 2011 to May 2016 the School was managed by Dr. K.K.R's Gowtham Concept Schools, a pioneer group of Educational Society from Andhra Pradesh. During September 2016, Pavai Varam Educational Trust took over the school's management and from 2021 it is being managed by the DAV Group of schools, Chennai, and had been running the school successfully ever since.

== Infrastructure ==
The School is spread across the BHEL Township as 3 separate campuses,

- The B Sector Primary School houses classes KG I to Standard V, Sections D, E, F
- The Junior School in B Sector, housing classes VI through VIII, Sections A through F
- The Main School, also in B Sector, housing Classes IX to XII

== Academia ==
The School follows the Central Board Of Secondary Education-Delhi, syllabus. The C.B.S.E. syllabus was exclusive in all of R.S.K's classes until 2000, after which due to public demand and the trends in the Professional Courses admissions in Tamil Nadu, the Management introduced (Tamil Nadu) State Board as an additional alternate syllabus for Classes XI and XII. The School excels in several sporting and cultural activities. The school has stopped supporting state board from 2022 allowing only CBSE students to continue

== Alumni ==
The school has an alumni network and an association called the Old Students' Association (OSA). Among its activities is organizing the cultural, technical, and sports festival OSCAR (Old Students' Celebration At R.S.K.). The association maintains its own website.
