= Bharathidasan Institute of Management =

Business school in Tamil Nadu, India

Bharathidasan Institute of Management, Tiruchirappalli
- Motto: Influencing Tomorrow
- Type: Self-financed Business School
- Established: 1984; 42 years ago
- Affiliations: Bharathidasan University AICTE NBA SAQS Business Education Alliance Member - AACSB
- Chairman: Ravi Appasamy
- Director: Asit Kumar Barma
- Students: 360
- Location: Trichy-Pudukottai Road, after Lechchumanapatti Toll Plaza, Kalamavur, Tamil Nadu, Kalamavur, Tamil Nadu, 622502, India
- Campus: Suburban
- Website: www.bim.edu

Bharathidasan Institute of Management, Tiruchirappalli (known by its abbreviation BIM-Trichy) is an Indian business school established in 1984 in Trichy, Tamil Nadu, India. The school offers AICTE approved full-time MBA program, doctoral programs, and many executive education programs. The college is often ranked among the well known Business Schools of the country ever since its inception.

== History ==
In August 1984 Bharat Ratna Shri. Chidambaram Subramaniam along with Prof. P. S. Manisundaram the Vice-Chancellor of Bharathidasan University and Dr. V. Krishnamurthy, former chairman of BHEL, chaired a meeting of academics and industrialists. A partnership was signed with Bharat Heavy Electricals Limited to create a management institute within the BHEL township in Tiruchirappalli Tamil Nadu.

== Collaborations ==
=== BIM and Bharat Heavy Electricals ===
BIM has pioneered the concept of a business school with an industry linkage through its symbiotic relationship with BHEL since its inception in 1984. Senior Executives of Bharat Heavy Electricals (BHEL) anchor courses particularly in the areas of Operations, Management and Systems. BIM conducts a number of Executive Development Programs for BHEL in the areas of Corporate Finance, Marketing and Organizational Behaviour. Students also take-up various projects offered by BHEL in different functional areas of management.

=== Collaboration with Defence Research and Development Organisation (DRDO) ===
The Institute of Technology Management (ITM) is a premier training institute of Defence Research & Development Organisation (DRDO), Ministry of Defence, Govt of India. The Institute of Technology Management (ITM) was the pioneer institute for the conduct of MBA with specialisation in Technology Management. This MBA program was undertaken in joint collaboration with Bharathidasan Institute of Management (BIM),Tiruchirappalli. Dr. APJ Abdul Kalam, SA to RM and Dr. Jayashankaran, the then director, BIM, signed the MOU in April 1996. Seven batches of students successfully passed out of ITM obtaining the degree of MBA with specialization in Technology Management.

Defence Research and Development Organization (DRDO) also has a close alliance with the Bharathidasan Institute of Management, Trichy (BIM). It offers training to selected DRDO scientists.

=== Collaboration with Confederation of Indian Industry ===
Confederation of Indian Industry (CII) has forged a tie-up with Bharathidasan Institute of Management, Tiruchirappalli or (BIM-Trichy) for developing systems and methodologies for finding solutions to problems faced by Small Scale Industries.

=== Tamil Nadu Chief Minister's Fellowship Program ===
BIM has been selected as the academic partner for the flagship two-year Tamil Nadu Chief Minister's Fellowship Program. A total of 24 persons will be granted the fellowship for research in 12 identified thematic areas related to: 1) augmenting the water resources, 2) increasing the agricultural production and create marketing linkages, 3) housing, 4) raising standards of education, 5) health sector boost, 6) achieving social inclusivity, 7) upgrade of infrastructure and facilitation of industrial development, 8) providing skill and entrepreneurship development, 9) facilitating institutional credit, 10) protecting the heritage and culture, 11) achieving ecological balance and 12) enhancing governance of data.

=== Academic Partner of Department of Finance in Govt. of Tamil Nadu ===
BIM has been selected as the academic Partner for conducting the prestigious Internship Program of department of Finance, Govt. of Tamil Nadu, across nine key functional areas like Tamil Nadu State Infrastructure Dev Board, Annual Budget, State and Central Finance Commission, Externally Aided Projects, Procurement, Loans, Audit, Treasury, and Resources.

=== BIM MoU with RoundSqr ===
BIM has signed a MoU with RoundSqr, a Hyderabad-based company working in AI and ML, for co-creation of knowledge and skills. Through this tie-up, students will be taught digital skills and the emerging applications of Artificial Intelligence and Machine Learning in Management.

=== BIM MoU with IMTI ===
BIM has signed a MoU with Irrigation Management Training Institute (IMTI), an institute under Water Resources Dept. of Public Works Department (PWD). This will enable the best practices of digital adoption through AI and ML in the space of irrigation and enhance farm productivity, agricultural management and rural entrepreneurship.

=== BIM tie up with CMT Association ===
BIM has tied up with CMT (Chartered Market Technician) for the certification of aspiring students of Finance which will enhance the ability of students to take up new age job roles.

== Admission ==
Admission to BIM is through Common Admission Test (CAT), conducted by the Indian Institutes of Management (IIMs). In addition to appearing for the CAT Exam, candidates have to apply separately for admission to BIM. Candidates shortlisted based on CAT score will be called for Group Discussion and Personal Interview before the final selection is made.

== BIM Consulting Group (BIMCG) ==
In September 2011, BIM has started a consulting group to render business consultancy services to organizations with special focus on developing and supporting micro, small and medium enterprises. BIMCG is a BIM Consulting Group of Bharathidasan Institute of Management that works with organizations to improve performance on a sustainable basis.

== Campus ==
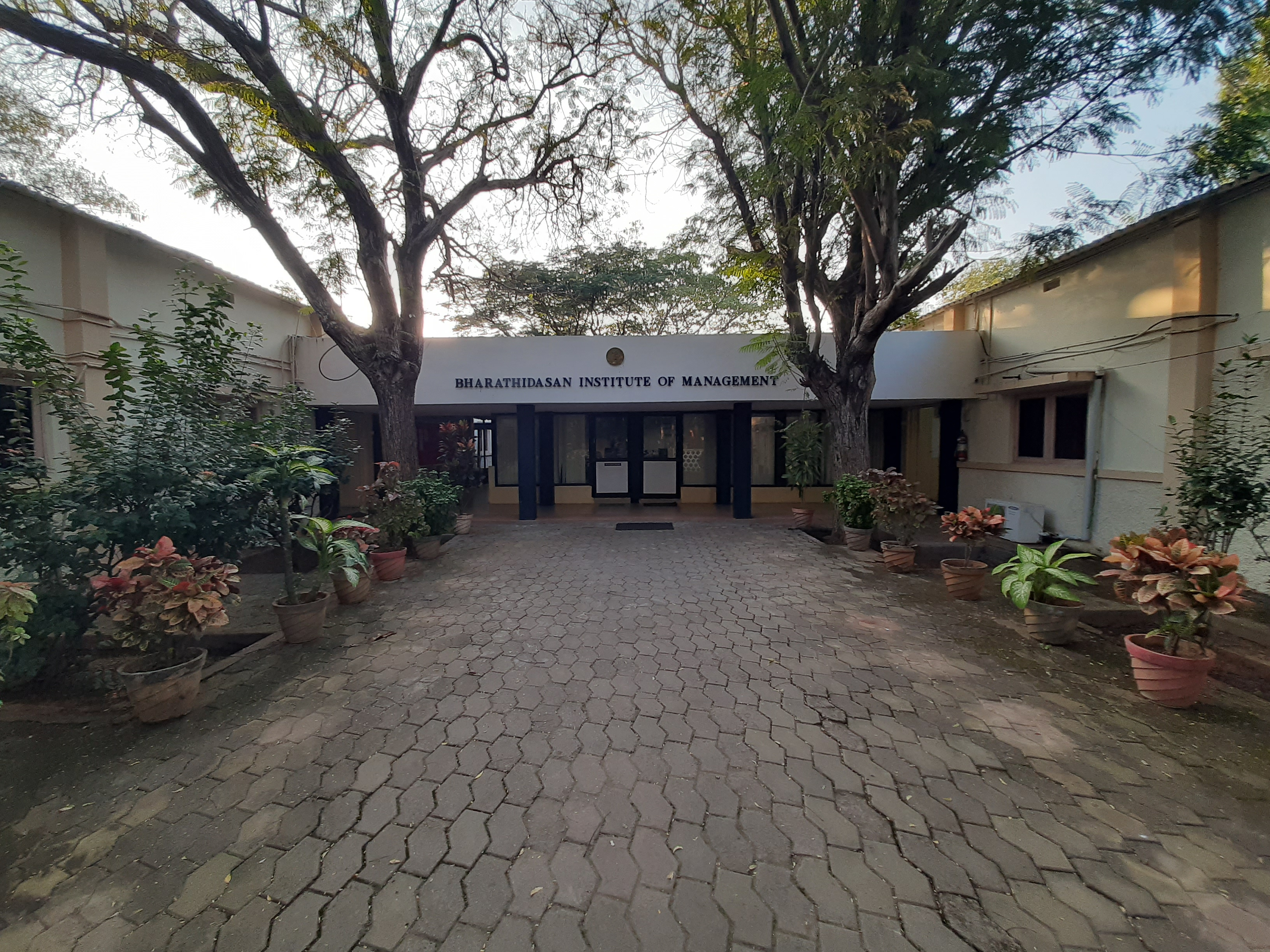
BIM Campus

Since its inception the institute has functioned from the BHEL Campus. The classes and hostel accommodation for students are provided in the MHD complex building in BHEL campus.
