= Vanitha Rangaraju =

Indian animator (born 1970)

- Born: Vanitha Rangaraju with 1970 (age 55–56); Tiruchirappalli
- Education: National Institute of Technology, Tiruchirappalli & University of Texas at Austin

Vanitha Rangaraju-Ramanan (born 1970) is an Indian animator who works for DreamWorks Animation. Rangaraju was part of the team for movie Shrek that won an Academy Award for Best Animated Feature at the 74th Academy Awards in Los Angeles, United States and BAFTA Award for Best Adapted Screenplay at the 55th British Academy Film Awards in London, United Kingdom, for which she was credited as Lighting Technical Director.

== Early life ==
Rangaraju was born 1970 in Tiruchirappalli, where she went to school and graduated with a Bachelor of Architecture from the Regional Engineering College, Tiruchirappalli (now known as National Institute of Technology, Tiruchirappalli). In 1996, she pursued Master's program at the University of Texas at Austin followed by an internship at Industrial Light & Magic in 1998. Since then she has been with DreamWorks Animation.

== Filmography ==
Vanitha has worked in the following films and shows:

Name			Role	Year
Shrek			technical director: lighting and effects	2001
Sprout			lead lighter	2002
Shrek 2			lead lighter	2004
Madagascar			lead lighter	2005
The Madagascar Penguins in a Christmas Caper			lead lighter	2005
Shrek the Third			effects lead	2007
Madagascar: Escape 2 Africa			computer graphics supervisor	2008
Merry Madagascar			head of lighting	2009
Scared Shrekless			digital effects supervisor	2010
Puss in Boots			head of lighting	2011
Madagascar 3: Europe's Most Wanted			visual effects supervisor	2012
Dragons	Riders of Berk (season 1)	Viking for Hire (episode 2)	overseas visual effects supervisor	2012
Dragons	Riders of Berk (season 1)	The Terrible Twos (episode 4)	overseas visual effects supervisor	2012
Madly Madagascar			digital effects supervisor	2013
The Boss Baby			visual effects supervisor	2017
The SpongeBob Movie: Sponge on the Run			visual effects supervisor	2020
