= Pragyan (festival) =

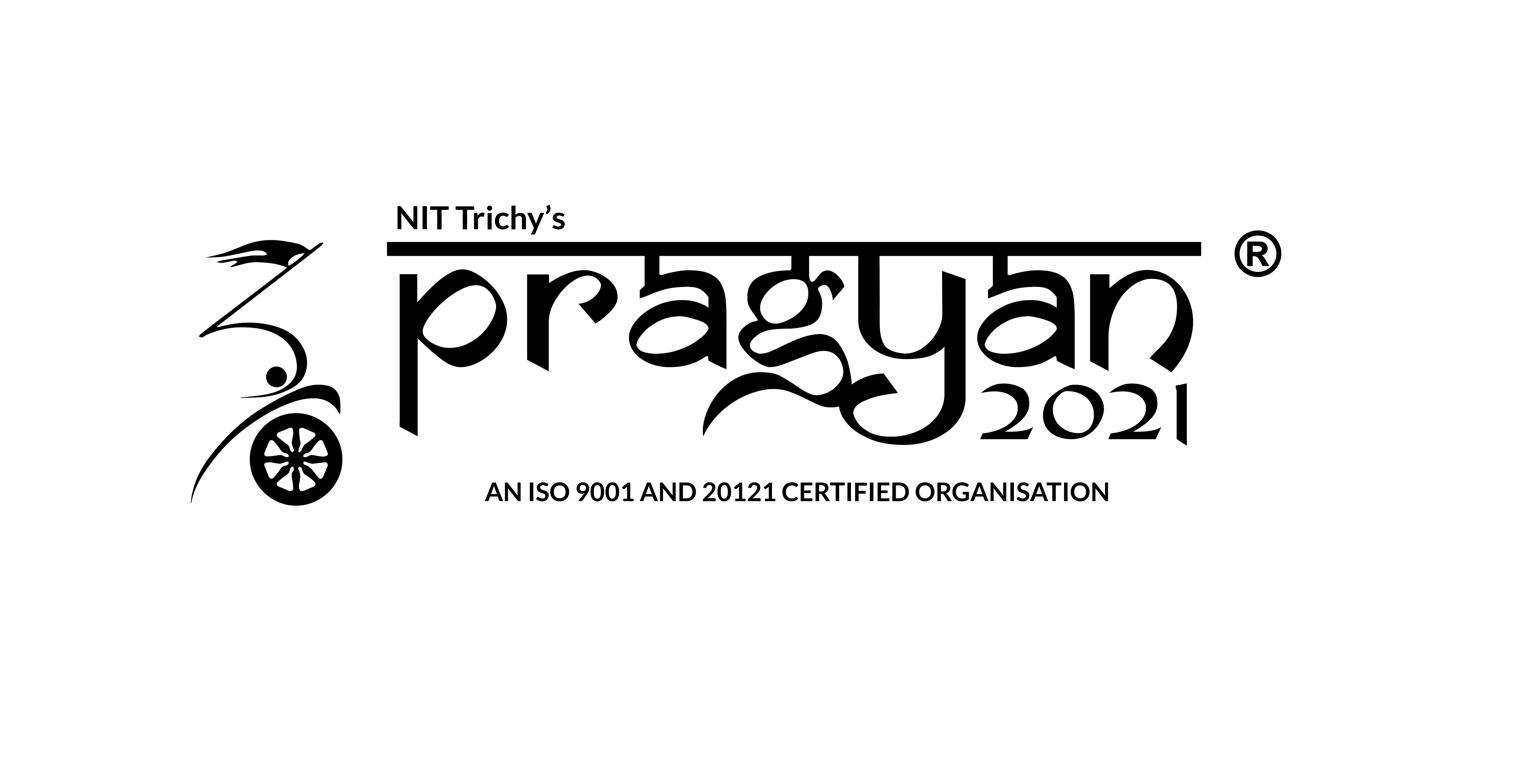
- Genre: Techno-managerial organisation
- Locations: Tiruchirappalli, India
- Founded: 2005
- Major events: Coding, robotics, management, paper presentation, guest lectures, infotainment, core engineering, exhibitions, workshops
- Filing status: Student-run non-profit
- Sponsor: NIT Trichy
- Prize money: ₹12,00,000
- Website: www.pragyan.org

Pragyan, NIT Trichy is the annual techno-managerial festival of the National Institute of Technology, Tiruchirappalli. Since its inception in 2005, it has been held every year over a period of three and a half days during the months of January, February, or March. Every year, participants from a number of colleges across the country take part in various events conducted as a part of Pragyan, making it one of the largest techno-managerial fests in India. It is also the first student-run organisation in the world and the third overall, next only to the London Olympics and Manchester United to get an ISO 20121:2012 certification for Sustainable Event Management. It also holds the ISO 9001:2015 certification for Quality Management Systems.

== History and growth ==
In 2005, the staff and students of NIT Trichy collaborated to create Pragyan as a technical festival attracting innovation from across the state. Pragyan has since expanded to include teams from over 60 countries taking part in the online events. In recent years, up to 700 volunteers have worked in hosting the event.

== Events ==
Pragyan conducts a variety of technical and cultural events throughout the year, including an annual technical festival that attracts participants from all over India. The festival features competitions in coding and robotics, as well as guest lectures from industry leaders. The goal is to promote technical and cultural education and provide opportunities for students to showcase their skills, creativity, and innovation. Pragyan also conducts workshops, seminars, and cultural events such as music, dance, and drama competitions. These events are designed to provide students with a well-rounded educational experience and allow them to explore their interests in technology, culture, and the arts. Pragyan's events are run by students and are open to participation from students across India. Pragyan’s events deal with a broad number of categories and are classified into various clusters.

Crossfire is a panel discussion event held during the fest. Crossfire aims to provide a global platform for academia, industry, and the government to interact with the student fraternity.

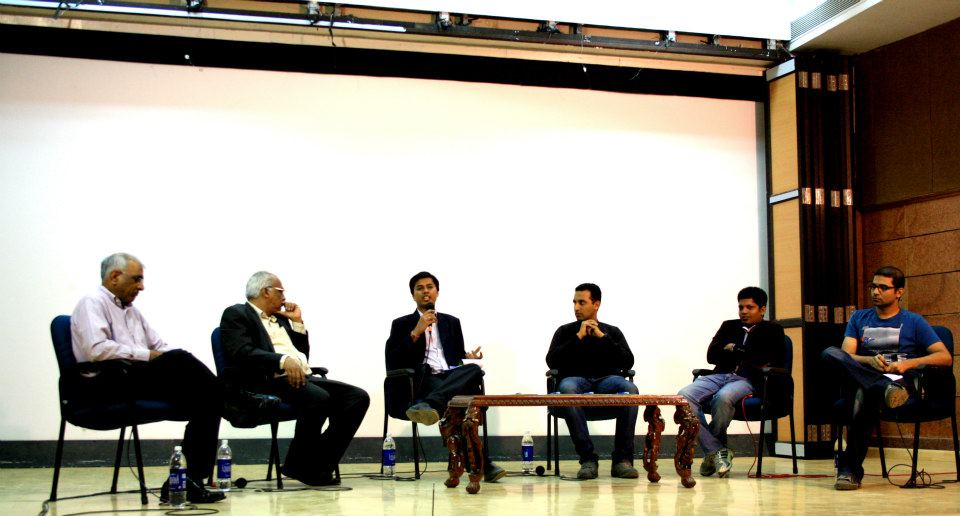
Panelists of Pragyan 2012 Crossfire

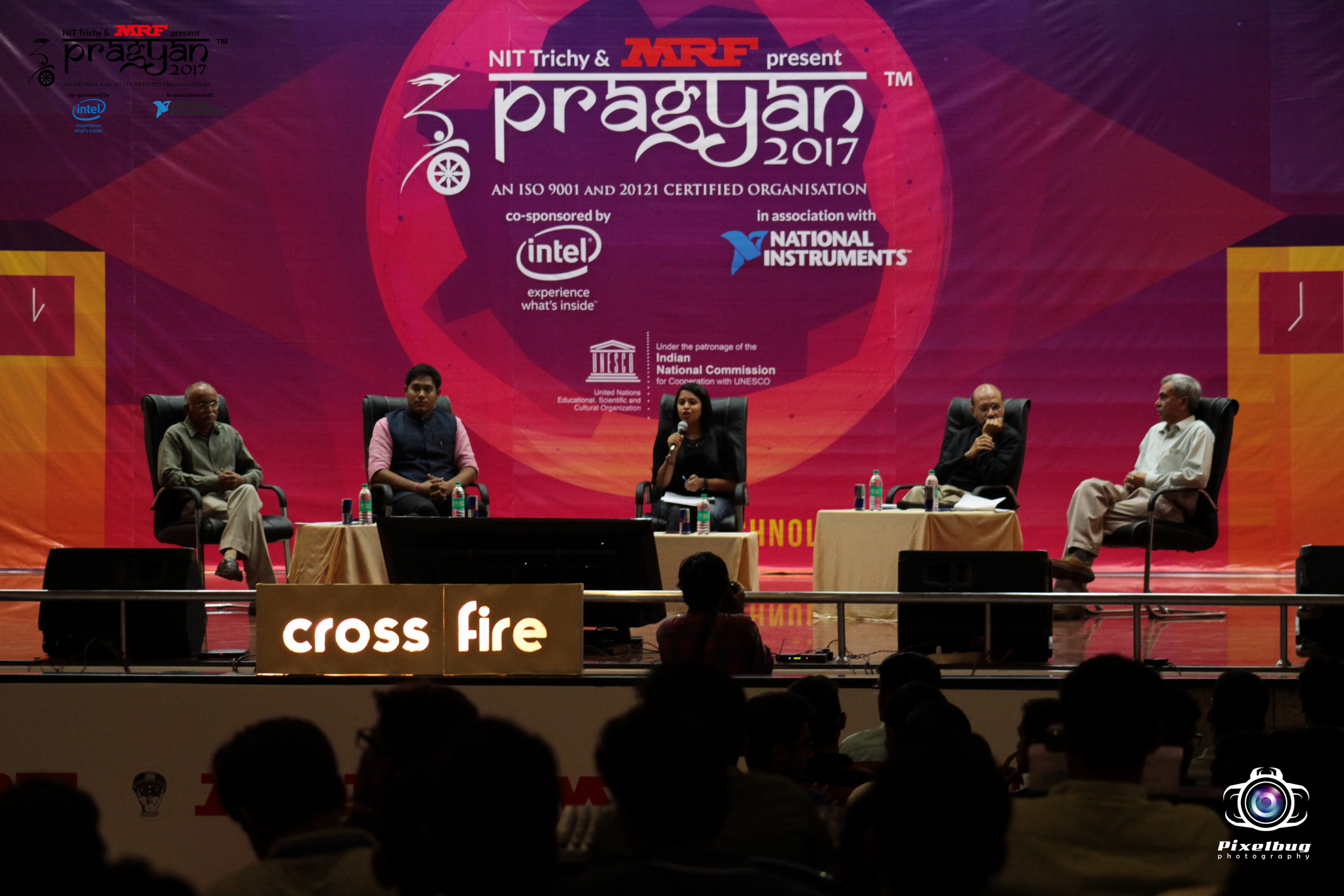
Panelists of Pragyan 2017 Crossfire

=== Guest lectures series ===
Guest lecture by Richard Mueller at Pragyan 2017

Each year the fest features lectures from several guest speakers.

Year	Guest lecturers
2021	Illumináre series: Dr. Vandana Verma, Dr. Rishikesha T. Krishnan, Dr. Ken Yeang, Mr. Phillip Rosedale, Mr. Yogesh Gupta
2020	Dr. V. R. Lalithambika, Dr. Najeeb Jung, Dr. Ashok Khemka, Dr. Manish Gupta, Dr. Teri W. Odom, Dr. David Reitze, Dr. Rajagopala Chidambaram, Mr. Josh Foulger.
2019	Dr. Spyridon Michalakis, Ms. Amrita Shah, Mr. Ramesh Venkatesan, Dr. Montek Singh Ahluwalia, Dr. Crystal Dilworth, Dr. P. G. Diwakar, Dr. Frederick J. Raab, Dr. Alwyn Didar Singh.
2018	Dr.B.N Suresh, Ajay Bhatt, Bhargavi Nuvvula, Dr. Camille Leclercq, Dr.Robert Metcalfe, Dr. A.S Ramasastri, Dr.Kevin Grazier, Meher Pudumjee, Shivshankar Menon, Ramamoorthy Ramesh.
2017	Richard A. Muller, Kishore Jayaraman, Henry Throop, David J. Peterson, Ada Yonath, A. Sivathanu Pillai, Rajshekhar Murthy, Nandini Harinath.
2016	Peter C. Schultz, Varun Agarwal, Ralph Leighton, Dr. Archana Sharma, Sudhir Kumar Mishra, Gianni Di Caro, Abhas Mitra, Rene Reinsburg.
2015	Marshall Strabala, Dr. Jitendra Joshi, Paul Halpern, Suneet Tuli, Robin Chase, T. S. Krishnamurthy, Ananth Krishnan, Jill Tarter, Raju Venkatraman, Guhesh Ramanathan, Scott R Peppet, Rakshit Tandon, Rakesh Godwani.
2014	L Sivasankaran, Kiruba Shankar, Anirudh & Pragun, Ram Gopal, Valerie Wagoner, Dr. Marcus du Sautoy, Jamie Hyneman, Dhananjayan Govind, Venkatesh Basker, Tevenos, T. V. Narendran.
2013	Anil Kakodkar, Tessy Thomas, Atul Gurtu, Rohan Dixit, David Christian, Richard Noble
2012	Gayle Lackmann McDowell, Gert Lanckriet, J. N. Reddy, Michael E. Brown, Jeff Lieberman, Swaminathan Gurumurthy, Dr.Vijay Chandru, Dr. Sivathanu Pillai and Narendra Nayak
2011	David Hanson (robotics designer), Sugata Mitra, Narayanan Krishnan, T. V. Padma, Stefan Engeseth and Ajeet N. Mathur
2010	Dr. Ramesh Jain, N S Ramaswamy, Dr. P. M. Bhargava, Dr. Sreenidihi Varadharajan, Raj Bala, Are Holen.
2009	Peter Norvig, Loren Acton, John C. Mather, Manish Tripathi and Kalyan Banerjee.
2008	Philippe Lebrun, Ronald Mallett, Noam Chomsky, Trilochan Sastry, K.R. Sridhar and Philip Zimmermann
2007	Douglas Osheroff, Rudolph Marcus, Guruswami Ravichandran, Gurcharan Das and Jimmy Wales
2006	Yash Pal, Stephen Wolfram, Christopher Gill, and Christopher Charles Benninger

The 2015 edition saw the introduction of 'Divergent', an inspirational talk series by youngsters who have made a marked contribution to the society. The speakers at the inaugural edition included Roman Saini, Vishnu Nair, Ajit Narayanan and Kartheeban.

=== Sangam and Ingenium ===
==== Sangam ====
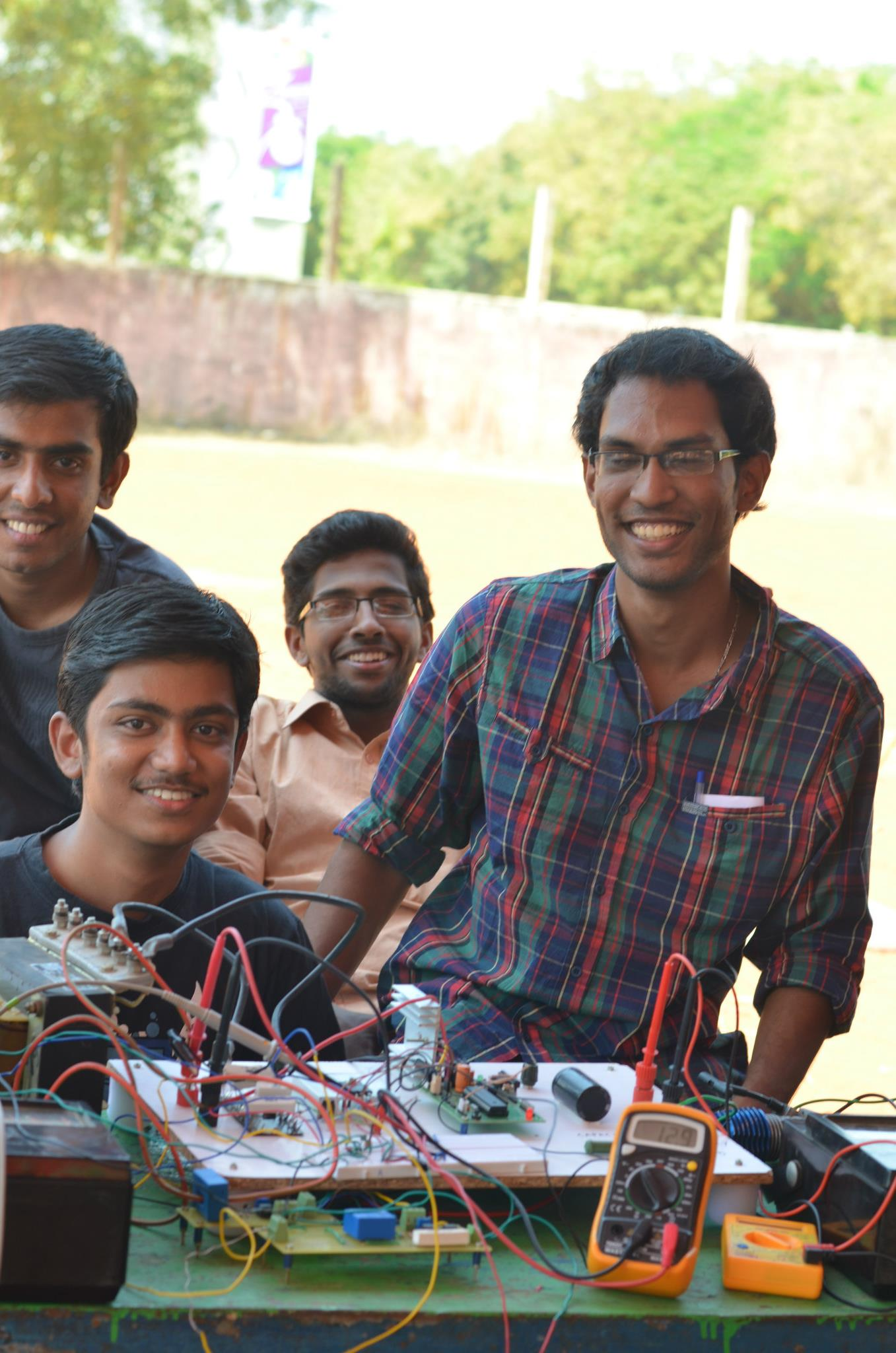
Pragyan 2013 Sangam project

Sangam is an exclusive intra-NITT technical contest involving the display of models and solutions developed by students from various departments. This event, which is held on all four days of Pragyan, provides a platform for students to implement their innovative ideas and earn recognition for the same from other participants, academics, technocrats, and

==== Ingenium ====
Ingenium, previously known as Anwesh, is a technical contest exclusively for students from colleges other than NIT Trichy. Giving students a chance to showcase their technical prowess through ideas and inventions, Ingenium strives to reignite the love for science and technology in students.

=== Infotainment ===
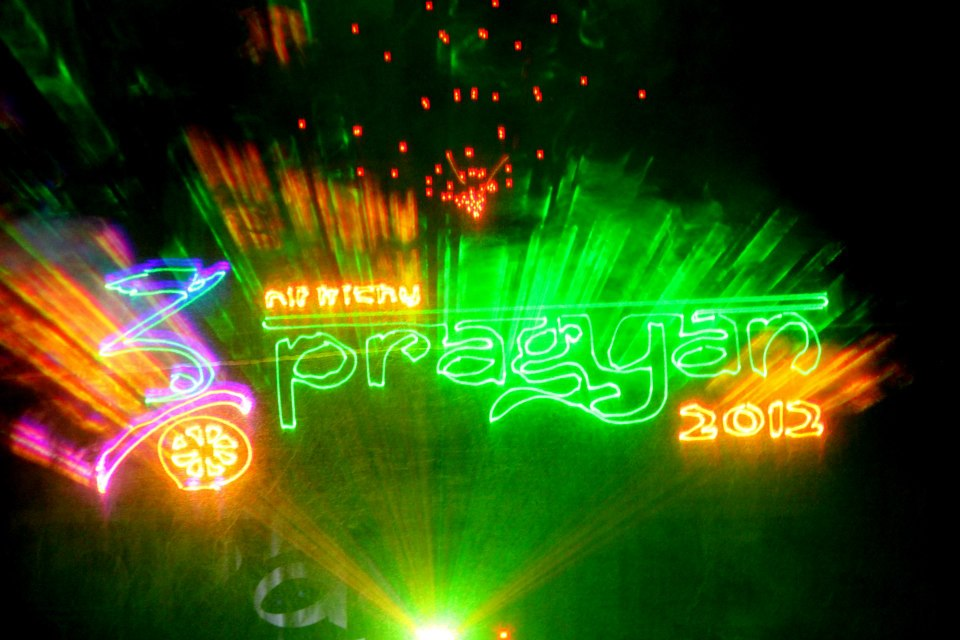
Pragyan 2012 Infotainment Lasers show

Since its inception in 2008, the Infotainment aspect of the fest has provided entertainment across genres that include acrobatics, dance, cardistry, illusion, light shows and comedy.

== Sponsors and partners ==
Pragyan is a non-profit organization established in India by students with the goal of advancing technical and cultural education. They hold various events such as technical and cultural festivals, workshops, and lectures. The organization, founded in 2005, is sustained through the support of sponsors from leading companies in the technology and engineering sectors such as Tata Steel, Texas Instruments, State Bank of India, Google, Pepsi, Marrybrown, Indian Oil Corporation, McAfee, National Instruments, Larsen & Toubro and Honeywell. These sponsors financially aid in the organization of events, including expenses for equipment and venue rentals. They also offer prizes and incentives for participants in Pragyan's events. Furthermore, the support from sponsors allows Pragyan to invite industry experts as guest speakers, providing students with opportunities to learn from and network with professionals in their field. For the 2022 edition of Pragyan, the principal sponsors were Salesforce, Agnostiq and Comedy Central.

== Pragyan Social Responsibility ==
In Pragyan 2012, a new wing of the organisation, called the Pragyan Social Responsibility (PSR) was added. A number of initiatives are conducted by the members of this wing targeted at diverse social groups.

=== Veetukku Oru Vignaani ===
A science exhibition for projects by school students, conducted by Puthiya Thalaimurai television network was hosted and managed by Pragyan for the first time in 2016. In 2017 the exhibition achieved acclamation after a grand state-level final was hosted by Pragyan at NIT Trichy. It received media coverage by Puthiya Thalaimurai with whom Pragyan collaborated to achieve this feat. Students from various schools across the state were invited to attend, participate, and exhibit their models and ideas.

=== Dhisai ===
The event ‘Dhisai’ aimed at educating the school students of Tamil Nadu about the Joint Entrance Examinations (JEE) was first introduced in 2015. Since then every year as a part of Dhisai a mock JEE exam has been conducted annually for the students of class 12 to create awareness about the JEE Examination.

== Square One ==
Pragyan Square One, formerly known as Outreach, was introduced with the aim of expanding the extent of technological advances and create awareness on scientific utilities in regions across the nation.

=== 2018 ===
Pragyan Square One was conducted in SKCET, Coimbatore on 7 and 8 October 2017 as well as in Thiagarajar College of Engineering on 9 and 10 September 2017. While the Coimbatore edition featured a 3D printing and a smart grid automation workshops, the edition held in Madurai focused on robot building and automobile architecture. Also events and competitions offering a grand combined prize pool of INR 50,000 were held.

The Square one edition at Mangalore was held on 3 February 2018 at the Sahyadri College of Engineering and Management. This was the third outreach event conducted by Pragyan which saw three events and a workshop on Introduction to Machine Learning.

=== 2017 ===
For the first time ever, Pragyan Square One was conducted in two cities- Chennai and Kochi. A workshop on Ethical Hacking was conducted at CUSAT, Kochi and workshops on robotics and embedded technology was conducted at SRM University, Kattankulathur Chennai simultaneously on 4 and 5 February 2017. Students were invited to take part in the regional rounds of events like Circuitrix, The Ultimate Manager, Hunt the Code and Pragyan Quiz. The top teams of each event were invited to take part in the national finals which were to be conducted during Pragyan 2017 at NIT Trichy.

=== 2016 ===
The 2016 edition of Pragyan saw 'Grab to Smash' a robot building contest, a Quadcopter workshop and a quiz event held in Kochi on 16 and 17 January 2016. The Chennai version held on 30 January saw the robot contest, 'Hunt the Code' competition for coding enthusiasts and an 'Ultimate Manager' contest. A design workshop was also held with CAD and Creo.

=== 2015 ===
The First edition of the Pragyan Square One (2015) was conducted in Chennai. It took place at the Sathyabama University, Chennai on 1 and 2 November 2014. Four different events were conducted during the course of the programme. This included a guest lecture, the Circuitrix event, the regional prelims of the Pragyan Open Quiz and a hovercraft workshop, conducted by the AeroSapiens, in association with the Third Dimension Aeromodeling club of NIT Trichy. The guest lecture had a turnout of about 250 students. The winners of the regional prelims in the quiz competition got a direct entry to the National Intercollegiate Pragyan Quiz held during Pragyan.

The 2015 edition of Pragyan saw yet another highlight event, the Hackathon conducted in association with Amazon India at Amazon, Hyderabad. The contest was held on 20 and 21 December 2014 and had more than a hundred participants working on various projects. The contest was a theme based one, with "Collaboration Tools" set as the theme of the contest and contestants had to develop mobile and web-based apps that would help people with 'team work'. The prizes were worth a total of ₹90,000.

== Special initiatives ==
=== Human library ===
Human Library was a new initiative by Pragyan in 2018 that saw 14 people with their inspiring stories interact with the students. The event held in association with Human Library, Hyderabad was the largest human library conducted by a student-run organisation. The Human Library at Pragyan proved to be an enriching experience, where students were presented with an opportunity to read about various sensitive and thought-provoking issues prevalent in society. The initiative was continued in the following editions.
