= National Institute of Technology, Tiruchirappalli =

Public engineering institution in Tamil Nadu, India

- Emblem of NIT Trichy
- Former name: Regional Engineering College Tiruchirappalli (1964–2003)
- Motto in English: Truth Alone Triumphs
- Type: National research deemed university Institute of national importance Centrally funded technical institute
- Established: 1964; 62 years ago
- Parent institution: Council of NITSER
- Accreditation: NAAC
- Academic affiliations: UGC
- Chairman: Ar. (Dr.) Amogh Kumar Gupta
- Director: Dr. G. Aghila
- Faculty: 415 (2021-22)
- Students: 7,385 (2021-22)
- Undergraduates: 4,401 (2021-22)
- Postgraduates: 2,002 (2021-22)
- Doctoral students: 982 (2021-22)
- Location: Tiruchirappalli, Tamil Nadu, 620015, India; 10.762°N 78.816°E
- Campus: 800 acres (3.2 km^{2}); Rural
- Language: English
- Colours: White, Dark Brown & Light Beige
- Website: www.nitt.edu

The National Institute of Technology Tiruchirappalli (NIT-Tiruchirappalli or NIT-Trichy) is a national research deemed university near the city of Tiruchirappalli in Tamil Nadu, India. It was founded as Regional Engineering College Tiruchirappalli in 1964 by the governments of India and Tamil Nadu under the affiliation of the University of Madras. The college was granted deemed university status in 2003 with the approval of the University Grants Commission (UGC), the All India Council for Technical Education (AICTE), and the Government of India and renamed the National Institute of Technology Tiruchirappalli.

NIT Trichy is recognized as an Institute of National Importance by the Government of India under the National Institutes of Technology, Science Education and Research (NITSER) Act, 2007 and is one of the members of the National Institutes of Technology (NITs) system, a group of centrally funded technical institutes governed by the Council of NITSER. The institute is funded by the Ministry of Education (MoE), Government of India; and focuses exclusively on engineering, management, science, technology, and architecture. The institute offers 10 bachelor's, 42 master's, and 17 doctoral programmes through its 17 academic departments and awards more than 2000 degrees annually.

The National Institutional Ranking Framework (NIRF) ranked NIT Trichy first among the NITs for nine consecutive years (2016 to 2024). NIRF also ranked the institute 8 for architecture, 9 for engineering, 51 for management, 31 for research, and 31 overall among the academic institutions in India in 2024. NIT Trichy was titled the "Best Industry-Linked NIT in India" by the Confederation of Indian Industry in 2015, and "University of the Year" by the Federation of Indian Chambers of Commerce and Industry in 2017.

== History ==
Pandit Jawaharlal Nehru, who was the prime minister of India from 1947 to 1964, wanted India to become a world leader in science and technology. Under his administration, the central government established fourteen regional engineering colleges (RECs) between 1959 and 1965 in various cities across India. The REC at Tiruchirappalli was established in 1964 under the affiliation of the University of Madras, as a co-operative venture between the Government of India and the Government of Tamil Nadu.

The founder of the college was Prof. P.S. Manisundaram, a pioneering educationist in India. He was a graduate of Loyola College, Chennai and the Technical University of Nova Scotia (now part of Dalhousie University), Canada. He served as the principal of REC Tiruchirappalli from its formation in 1964 to 1982.

In the early 1980s, the state government began to find the logistics of controlling these colleges from Madras to be tedious and split the aegis into the Bharathidasan and Bharathiar universities for the Tiruchirappalli and Coimbatore areas, respectively. In 1982, the college was thus incorporated under the Bharathidasan University umbrella, of which Dr. P.S. Manisundaram served as the inaugural vice-chancellor. The institute would grant degrees under this name for the next 20 years, except for a brief stint under Anna University in 2001 and 2002. The college continued its progress under Bharathidasan University.

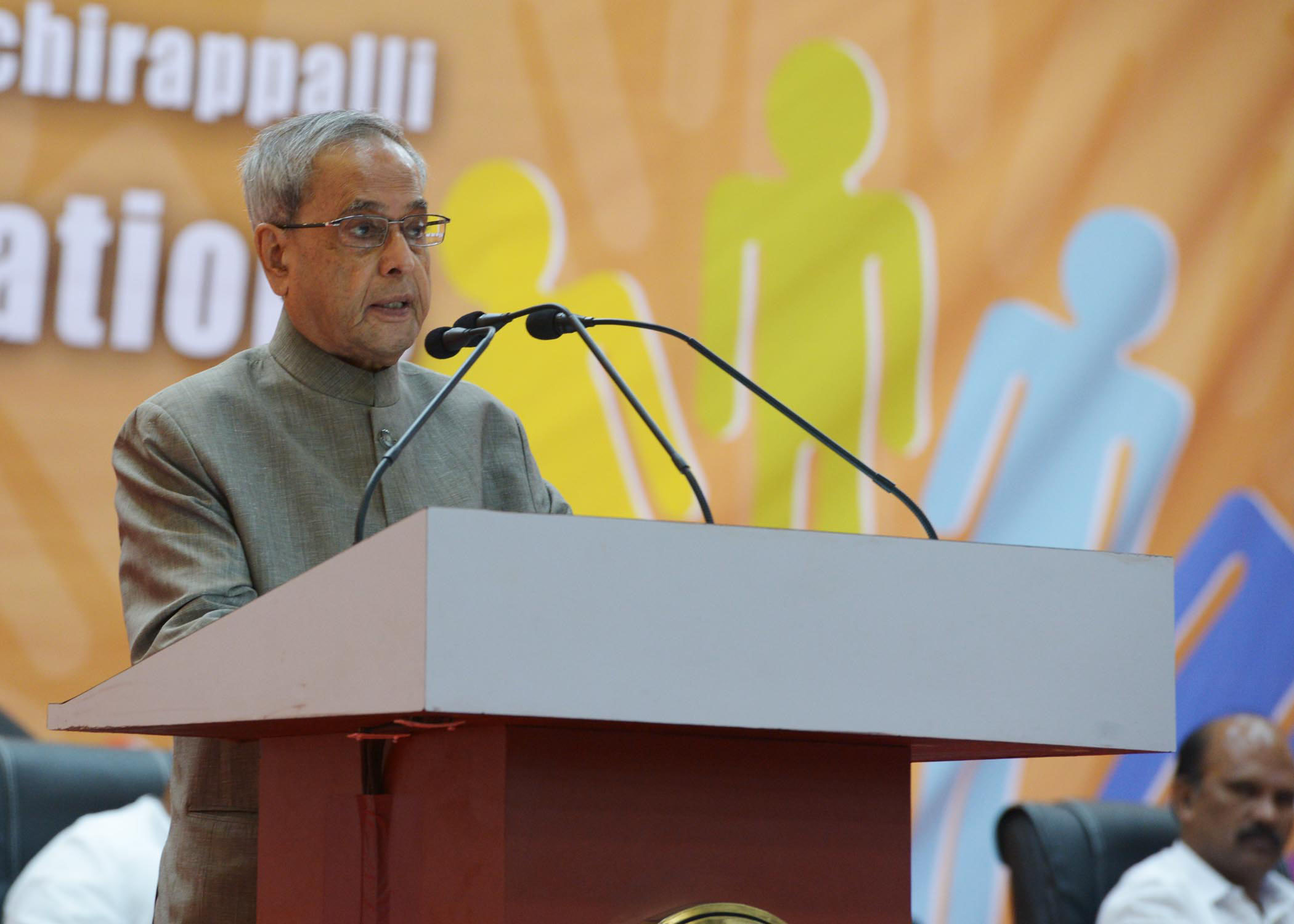
Then President of India Shri Pranab Mukherjee addressing at the golden jubilee celebration of NIT Trichy

In 2001, Anna University was granted authority over REC Tiruchirappalli. This was temporary, however, as the 40-year collaboration between the central and the state governments for all the RECs finally dissolved; the central government upgraded all the RECs to NITs and completely took control of them under the Ministry of Human Resource Development (now known as the Ministry of Education). In 2002, former minister of human resource development Murali Manohar Joshi decided to upgrade the RECs to NITs. At the end of that very same year, the institution was granted deemed university status with the approval of the UGC and AICTE; it was renamed the National Institute of Technology Tiruchirappalli and was finally granting degrees under its own name. In 2007, the National Institutes of Technology Act (now known as the NITSER Act) was passed, which declared NITs as Institutes of National Importance along the lines of the Indian Institutes of Technology (IITs).

NIT Trichy celebrated its golden jubilee anniversary on July 19 and 20, 2014, with the president of India Shri Pranab Mukherjee presiding over the event as the chief guest.

== Campus ==
=== Main Zone ===
The campus spans 800 acres (3.2 km^{2}) and is one of the largest academic campuses in India. The main entrance is located on the southern end of the campus, facing National Highway 67. There is one other entrance, popularly called the Staff Gate. The institute's academic facilities are located in the southern half of the campus; these include the department buildings, laboratories and workshops, lecture halls, computer centres and the central library. The campus has separate buildings for the departments of nine engineering, architecture, management, computer applications, energy and environment engineering.

==== Administrative Building ====
The administrative building with its clock tower is one of the institute's landmarks. This building houses the administrative offices and also the offices of the director and deans. The eastern and western wings of this building were occupied by the physics and chemistry departments respectively prior to the opening of Ojas for the same departments in 2016.

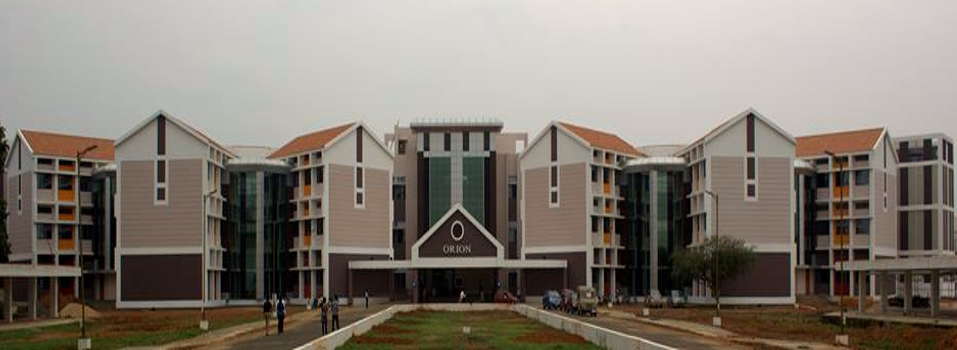
Orion Lecture Hall

==== Orion ====
The Orion is the lecture hall complex for the undergraduate students and consists of twenty-four large lecture halls. Each hall can accommodate around two hundred students and consists of projectors and televisions to make the lectures interactive. The shape of the Orion building is number eight. A decommissioned MIG-23 jet, presented by the Indian Air Force to the institute, is installed behind the Orion building.

==== Central Library ====
NIT Trichy has a modern central library with more than two and a half lakh of documents consisting of technical books, reports, standards, compact disks and back volumes of journals. The library subscribes to more than two hundred print periodicals, more than five thousand e-Journals and more than six hundred e-books besides a holding of around eighteen thousand back volumes of journals. The library also contains around two lakh books in the Book Bank scheme. The institute is holding membership with British Council Library, Chennai. They are also holding membership with Developing Library Network, New Delhi and providing Inter-Library Loan services to the users. The library also provides air-conditioned and Wi-Fi enabled reading halls. It is situated opposite to the civil engineering department building. The building also houses the Centre for Entrepreneurial Development and Incubation (CEDI). The old library building temporarily housed the Indian Institute of Management, Tiruchirappalli.

==== Octagon Centre ====
The Octagon is the institute's primary computer centre, with eight computer labs, printing facilities and a variety of engineering software for use by students. The Octagon also serves as a central hub for interconnecting the campus-wide LAN. This LAN caters to totally six thousand users across the campus and has a 10 Gbit/s fibre optic backbone. The original facility, opened in 1990, was extended into the second building in 2006; there are plans to further expand the facility in view of the increase in student enrollment. A brand new computer centre was inaugurated in the year 2016 which houses more than three hundred computers.

==== NITT Hospital ====
The institute hospital is located within the campus, it is located amidst the hostel/residential zone and the academic zone.The NITT Hospital provides primary health care round the clock on all the days.NITT Hospital has casualty, OP & IP facilities, 24 hours fully equipped ambulance, 24 hours pharmacy and a clinical laboratory working during 07:00 a.m. to 09:00 p.m.

==== Student Activity Centre ====
The institute has a student activity centre (SAC) and is the hub for most of the major extra-curricular activities. The SAC building was inaugurated in the year 2012. The dance, music and the National Cadet Corps groups carry out all their activities at the SAC, along with a few technical clubs like Spider R&D and RMI. It also houses Café Coffee Day, Domino's, and Mercely's Ice Cream Parlor .

==== Student Centre for Innovation in Engineering and Technology (SCIEnT) ====
SCIEnT is an open innovation center established by the REC Trichy alumnus batch of 1990 to foster interdisciplinary technical innovation. The center is accessible 24/7 to all students of the institute, regardless of their academic branch or degree program, providing them with the resources needed to develop prototypes. Its facilities include a diverse inventory of engineering equipment, ranging from mechanical hand tools and conventional lathes to electronic components and advanced development hardware like Intel Galileo boards. In addition to physical infrastructure, SCIEnT supports student-led projects by providing essential funding, material resources, and technical mentorship.

=== Shopping Complex Zone ===
To cater to the needs of the students and other residents, the institute has a shopping complex within its premises. It houses 2K supermarket, that sells stationary, groceries and other items. State Bank Of India (NIT branch) is located inside the campus, with two ATMs, oner near Barn Hall and the other in the Shopping Complex. A fully functional India Post Office is located in the Shopping Complex with Speed Post facility. Anjappar Chettinad Restaurant is present in the Shopping Complex Zone as well

=== Residential Zone ===
Residential facilities are provided on campus for students, faculty and staff of the institute. Most students live on campus in the residential hostels. In all, there are twenty-two boys' and five girls' hostels with a capacity of five thousand students. With the exception of the girls' hostel, all the others are located on the northern side of the campus. Meals are served by two mega messes and two government messes along with a pure vegetarian mess located on campus. There are several cafeterias on campus where food is available for purchase.

== Organization ==
=== Academic departments ===
Departments & Year Founded
- Civil Engineering: 1964
- Electrical and Electronics Engineering: 1964
- Mechanical Engineering: 1964
- Chemical Engineering: 1967
- Metallurgical and Materials Engineering: 1967
- Electronics and Communication Engineering: 1968
- Chemistry: 1971
- Production Engineering: 1977
- Management Studies: 1978
- Architecture: 1980
- Computer Science and Engineering: 1982
- Instrumental and Control Engineering: 1993
- Energy and Environment: 1995
- Humanities and Social Sciences: 2004
- Computer Applications: -
- Mathematics: -
- Physics: -

The institution started in 1964 with three engineering departments, namely, Civil Engineering, Electrical and Electronics Engineering and Mechanical Engineering. In 1967, the departments of Chemical Engineering and Metallurgical and Materials Engineering were established. The Electronics and Communication Engineering department was established in the year 1968. The faculty members of the Electronics and Communication Engineering department established and maintain the Campus Communication Services (CCS), National Knowledge Network (NKN), and virtual class rooms of the institute. The Departments of Production Engineering, Architecture, Computer Science and Engineering, and Instrumentation and Control Engineering were established in 1977, 1980, 1982, and 1993, respectively.

The Department of Management Studies (DoMS) was established in 1978 and is one of the oldest business schools in India. It offers an MBA programme with specializations in human resource management, marketing, finance, production and operations, business analytics, information systems and IT consulting, and general management. Unlike the rest of the courses in the institute, DoMS follows a trimester pattern with a two-month compulsory internship at the end of the first year.

The Department of Energy and Environment (DEE), formerly known as the Centre for Energy and Environmental Science and Technology (CEESAT), was founded in 1995 with the support of the governments of the United Kingdom and India. The goal of DEE is to develop technologies and technical human resources to address problems and create a better energy and environmental future. DEE supports energetic research and instruction in the fields of environmental pollution control, energy and environmental audit, and sustainable energy technology. The academic staff members of DEE received training at several UK universities, including the University of Manchester Institute of Science and Technology, De Montfort University, the Universities of Salford, Sheffield, Reading, and Leeds, as well as the Building Research Establishment.

The Department of Computer Applications is one of the institution's first departments to provide information technology courses like the MCA, and it is also among the top five departments in the nation that offer MCA programmes.

The Department of Humanities and Social Sciences (formerly known as the Department of Humanities) was established in 2004. This Department is renowned for independent, interdisciplinary research and for a environment for interaction between teachers and students. The department has continuously worked towards a practical curriculum with a high degree of professional relevance, enabling students to take on real-world difficulties. This has been done to fulfil the demands of industry, business, public and private organizations, academic institutions, and human services. As a result, the department has been providing both undergraduates and graduates with a broad selection of core and elective courses. Since 2004, the department has offered a full-fledged Ph.D. programme and has generated excellent research in more recent Humanities and Social Sciences fields. The department also provides minor degree courses in language/literature and economics in response to the rising demand for humanities-based courses.

The institute has science departments in Chemistry, Mathematics, and Physics. The departments of Chemistry and Physics receive exclusive funding from the Department of Science and Technology, Government of India.

=== Governance ===
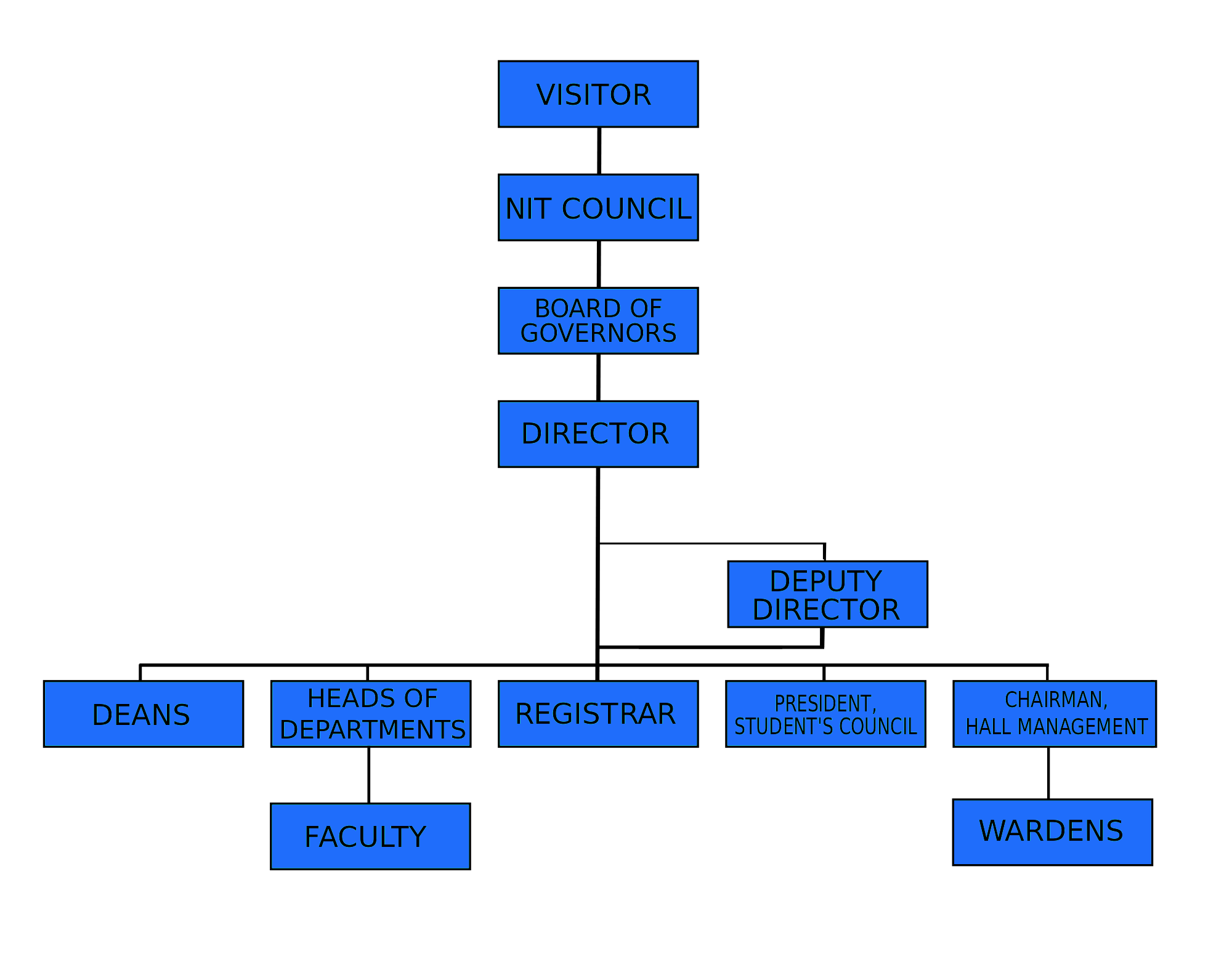
Organisation structure of National Institute of Technology

Principals & Directors

Principals
- Prof. P. S. Manisundaram: 1964-1982
- Prof. S. Nagarathinam: 1982-1990
- Prof. B. Ilango: 1990-1995
- Dr. P. Aravindan: 1997-2000
- Dr. M. Arumugam: 2000-2003

Directors
- Dr. M. Chidambaram: 2005-2010
- Dr. Srinivasan Sundarrajan: 2011-2016
- Dr. Mini Shaji Thomas: 2016-2021
- Dr. G. Aghila: 2022-till date

The Council of NITSER (formerly NIT Council) is the governing institution of NIT Trichy, and it includes the minister-in-charge of technical education in the Central Government, the chairmen and the directors of all the NITs, the chairman of the University Grants Commission, the director-general of the Council of Scientific and Industrial Research, the directors of other selected central institutions of repute, members of Parliament, the joint council secretary of the Ministry of Education, nominees of the Central Government, the All India Council for Technical Education, and the visitor.

Below the NIT Council is the board of governors of NIT Trichy. The board of governors consists of the chairman and ten members, which include government, industry, alumni and faculty representation.

The director serves under the board of governors and is the school's chief academic and executive officer. Academic policies are decided by its Senate, which is composed of some professors and other representatives. The Senate controls and approves the curriculum, courses, examinations, and results. Senate committees examine specific academic matters. The teaching, training, and research activities of various departments of the institute are periodically reviewed to maintain educational standards. The director is the ex officio chairman of the Senate. The deputy director is subordinate to the director. Together they manage the deans, heads of departments, the registrar, the president of the Students' Council, and the chairman of the Hall Management Committee. Deans and heads of departments in NITs are administrative postings rather than career paths. Faculty members serve as deans and heads of departments for limited periods, typically two to three years, then returning to regular faculty duties. The registrar is the chief administrative officer and overviews day-to-day operations. Below the head of department, are the various faculty members (professors, assistant professors, and lecturers). The warden serves under the chairman of the Hall Management Committee.

== Academics ==
NIT Trichy offers undergraduate and postgraduate programmes in disciplines spanning engineering, science, arts, architecture and management. The institute has 17 departments with more than 250 faculty members and 6,000 enrolled students. The following explains the academic programmes offered by the institute and their admission procedure:

=== Undergraduate ===
The institute awards Bachelor of Technology (B.Tech.) degrees in nine engineering disciplines as well as the Bachelor of Architecture (B.Arch.) degree through its architecture discipline. The B.Tech. and B.Arch. degree programmes are four and five years long respectively.

Admission for Indian candidates to the undergraduate programmes is highly competitive and is based on the rank secured in the Joint Entrance Examination – Main (JEE Main) and selection through the Joint Seat Allocation Authority (JoSAA) and Central Seat Allocation Board (CSAB). To be eligible for admission in the undergraduate programmes, the candidates in the general category have to secure at least 75% marks or be in the top 20 percentile and the candidates in the Scheduled Castes (SC) and Scheduled Tribes (ST) category have to secure at least 65% in the 12th class examination conducted by the respective Boards. The JEE Main is considered to be one of the toughest examinations in the world and the high school science students who clear the examination with top ranks generally opt NIT Trichy as their first choice for admissions in undergraduate programmes. Admission for Foreign Nationals, Children of Indian Workers in the Gulf Countries (CIWG), Persons of Indian Origin (PIOs), Non-Resident Indians (NRIs) and Overseas Citizen of India (OCI) in the undergraduate programmes is based on the rank secured in the JEE Main and selection through the online portal of Direct Admission of Students Abroad (DASA).

=== Postgraduate ===
The institute offers 42 master's programmes, which include 23 programmes leading to Master of Technology (M.Tech.) degrees, 11 programmes in engineering leading to Master of Science (M.S.) by research degrees, 4 programmes in science and computer science leading to Master of Science (M.Sc.) degrees and a programme in architecture, arts, computer applications and business leading to Master of Architecture (M.Arch.), Master of Arts (M.A.), Master of Computer Applications (MCA) and Master of Business Administration (MBA) respectively.

To be eligible for admission to the postgraduate programmes, the candidate has to secure a minimum percentage or CGPA set by the institute or admission authorities of the government of India in the qualifying degree from a university or an institute recognized by the Association of Indian Universities or similar Indian body. Admission to the M.Tech. and M.Arch. programmes is based on the merit list prepared by the Centralized Counseling for M.Tech./M.Arch./M.Plan./M.Des. (CCMT) on the basis of Graduate Aptitude Test in Engineering (GATE) scores as well as selection through CCMT online portal. Admission to the M.S. by research programmes is based on the GATE score and personal interview conducted by the institute. Admission to the M.Sc. programmes is based on the merit list prepared by the Centralized Counselling for M.Sc./M.Sc.(Tech.) (CCMN) on the basis of the ″Common Percentile″ (calculated from the Joint Admission Test for Masters (JAM) Rank) and selection through the CCMN online portal. Admission to the MCA programme is based on the rank secured in the NIT MCA Common Entrance Test (NIMCET) and selection through the NIMCET online portal. Admission to the M.A. programme is through the interview conducted by the institute. Admission to the MBA programme is through the rank secured in the Common Admission Test and personal interviews conducted by the institute.

Applicants interested in seeking admission to the postgraduate programmes who are foreign nationals, PIOs, OCIs who have completed undergraduate programme in any country (including India) or Indian nationals who have completed their undergraduate programme outside India or Indian nationals who have acquired NRI status and holding it for the last three years after obtaining undergraduate degree from India or Indian nationals who have completed undergraduate programme in any centrally funded technical institute under the DASA Scheme or Indian nationals who have completed undergraduate programme in India but have completed their 11th and 12th standard (or equivalent) from outside India, are requested to check the admission details in DASA and institute websites.

The institute also offers 17 Doctorate of Philosophy (PhD) degrees programmes. Admissions to the PhD programmes are based on written tests followed by personal interviews conducted by the institute. The doctoral research scholars are given a topic by the professor or work on the consultancy projects sponsored by the industry. Teaching assistantships (TA) and research assistantships (RA) are provided based on the scholar's profile.

=== Reputation and Rankings ===
University rankings

Global – Overall
- CWUR World: 1574 (2024)
- QS World: 701–710 (2025)
- THE World: 801–1000 (2025)
- USNWR Global: 1510 (2024-2025)

Regional – Overall
- QS Asia: =308 (2025)
- THE Asia: 201–250 (2024)
- THE Emerging Economies: 301–350 (2022)
- USNWR Asia: 555 (2024-2025)

National – Overall
- CWUR National: 43 (2024)
- NIRF National: 31 (2024)
- USNWR National: 50 (2024-2025)

Ministry of Education Government of India

NIRF India Rankings 2024
- Overall: 31
- Architecture: 8
- Engineering: 9
- Management: 51
- Research: 31

==== General Ranking ====
Globally, NIT Trichy is ranked 1574 by the Center for World University Rankings (CWUR) in 2024, 701–710 by the QS World University Rankings (QS) in 2025, 801–1000 by the Times Higher Education World University Rankings (THE) in 2024, and 1510 by the U.S. News & World Report Best Global University Ranking (USNWR) in 2024–2025.

In Asia, the institute is ranked 573 by CWUR in 2024, 301–350 by QS in 2024, 201–250 by THE in 2024 and 450 by USNWR in 2022–2023. Also, the institute was ranked 301–350 in emerging economies by THE in 2022.

In India, the institute is ranked 43 by CWUR in 2024, 31 overall by NIRF in 2024 and 41 by USNWR in 2022–2023.

==== Research Performance ====
The SCImago Institutions Rankings (SIR), which rank academic and research institutions worldwide on research, innovation and societal factors, ranked the institute 75 among the universities in India, 133 among all sectors in India, 2712 among the universities worldwide and 6031 among all sectors worldwide in 2023. For research particularly, SIR ranked the institute 79 among the universities in India, 133 among all sectors in India, 2935 among the universities worldwide and 6225 among all sectors worldwide in 2023. NIRF ranked the institute 31 among the institutions in India for research in 2024.

==== Subject Ranking ====
QS ranked the institute 451-500 for electrical and electronic engineering and 501-520 for mechanical engineering among the universities worldwide in 2023.

THE ranked the institute 601-800 for engineering and technology in 2023, 601-800 for physical sciences and 601+ for computer science among the universities worldwide in 2020.

USNWR ranked the institute 562 for engineering, 604 for materials science, 854 for chemistry and 699 for computer science among the universities worldwide in 2024–2025.

NIRF ranked the institute 8 for architecture, 9 for engineering and 51 for management in India in 2024.

Outlook India ranked the institute 9 among government colleges for engineering in India in 2024.

== Research ==
Ministry of Education Government of India

NIRF Innovation Rankings 2023
- Rank: 151-300

Research at NIT Trichy is sponsored by various Indian government agencies. The departments of the institute also undertake consulting projects with government agencies. The institute's scientific output averages 700 papers and 10,000 citations per year. In addition, the institute's research community is actively involved in transforming unique concepts into products or processes, and it has several published and issued patents to its name. The institute has signed a memorandum of understanding (MoU) with several academic institutions, governmental organizations, and public and private companies to carry out research activities at the institute. The institute's income for sponsored research and consultancy projects was more than ₹14 crores and ₹7 crores, respectively, for the financial year 2022–23. Stanford University named 14 researchers from the institute in their world's top 2% scientists list for the year 2020. In 2023, NIT Trichy was ranked 151-300 among the higher education institutions in India in the NIRF Innovation Rankings.

=== Centres of Excellence ===
Centres of Excellence & Year Founded
- Corrosion and Surface Engineering: 2012
- Transportation Engineering: 2013
- Manufacturing: 2018
- Artificial Intelligence and Machine Learning: 2020
- Advanced Manufacturing and Automation: 2021
- Energy Harvesting and Storage: 2021
- Combustion and Emission Studies: 2021
- Electronics System Design, Calibration and Testing: 2021
- Emergency Response Support System: 2023

The institute has centres of excellence (CoE), focusing on research and providing consultancy in particular technical fields. The CoE in Corrosion and Surface Engineering specializes in the field of corrosion and surface engineering. The centre offers MS and PhD programmes and has signed MoUs with government agencies, public and private companies. The CoE in Transportation Engineering focuses on research in the areas of Transportation Planning, Intelligent Transportation Systems and Pavement Engineering. The CoE in Manufacturing provides consulting services to businesses in the areas of automation, product development, process improvement, shop floor design, etc. as well as training current employees in technology. The CoE in Artificial Intelligence and Machine Learning is focused on interdisciplinary research in artificial intelligence and crisis management, healthcare, decision support systems, and other areas which have an impact on society. The CoE in Advanced Manufacturing and Automation (CAMA) is a centre in the institute that offers technology support to businesses. The center's systems include a 3D metal additive manufacturing facility, a Femto laser micro-machining system, a laser shock peening setup, and a high temperature indentation tester. With the state-of-the-art facilities provided by the CoE in Energy Harvesting and Storage, researchers investigate, invent, create, and analyze materials that can capture energy and storage through technological improvements. Centre for Combustion and Emission Studies is equipped with high-end workstations for simulating complex combustion problems and the chemical kinetics of E-fuels. Centre for Electronics System Design, Calibration, and Testing covers testing and calibration methodologies in semiconductor device characterization, VLSI circuits, MICs, RF antennas, MEMS devices, power electronics, and embedded IoT systems. An indigenous integrated platform called the Emergency Response Support System (ERSS) was created for intelligent emergency response, which is controlled by the CoE in Emergency Response Support System.

=== Space Technology Incubation Centre ===
The Space Technology Incubation Centre (S-TIC), established by the Indian Space Research Organisation (ISRO) at the NIT Trichy campus, fosters startups to develop products and applications alongside industry that will be used for future space missions. It is the first facility of its kind in south India. The S-TIC unites business, academia, and ISRO under one roof, enabling them to support projects related to research and development for the Indian Space Program.

=== Centre for Entrepreneurship Development and Incubation ===
Centre for Entrepreneurship Development and Incubation (CEDI) is an independent company promoted by NIT Trichy. CEDI was founded in 2012 and registered under Section 8 of the Companies Act. CEDI facilitates the incubated companies to access NIT Trichy's common infrastructure facilities, departmental laboratories and other resources of NIT Trichy for their products development purposes. All the necessary mentoring and support for mobilizing funds, creating access to markets and augmenting managerial skills are provided by the CEDI centre.

CEDI has implemented a project – Technological Incubation and Development of Entrepreneurs (TIDE) funded by the Ministry of Electronics and Information Technology, Government of India, which aims to enable young entrepreneurs to initiate technology start-up companies for commercial exploitation of technologies developed by them in the areas of information and communications technology and electronics. CEDI has implemented faculty and entrepreneurship development programmes for faculty, students and potential and existing entrepreneurs in the Tiruchirappalli region. These programmes are sponsored by the Department of Science and Technology through the Entrepreneurship Development Institute of India.

== Student Life ==
=== Sports ===
Most of the institute's athletic facilities are located in and around the sports centre which includes indoor badminton courts and a fitness centre for men. The Opal hostel, which is the girl's hostel also includes a gym. Adjoining this building are a 25-metre (82 ft) swimming pool and an outdoor stadium with a 400-metre (1,300 ft) track, which is also used as a cricket field. Other facilities on campus include basketball courts and indoor table tennis tables in the residential hostels. A new indoor sports arena near to the basketball court was inaugurated in 2014. In 2017, two lawn tennis courts have been built near to basketball court.

=== Clubs and Societies ===
NIT Trichy has over 35 student groups spanning a variety of interests, including cultural, social and professional groups, student publications and recreational groups. Undergraduate students participate in one of three national programmes in their first year: the National Cadet Corps, the National Sports Organisation or the National Service Scheme.

Social Services

The community service initiatives and social service groups at NIT Trichy focus primarily on community outreach related to social causes, healthcare, and environmental sustainability. IGNITTE is the official teaching club which trains underprivileged students to prepare for national competitive exams. Other initiatives aim towards educational support and peer mentorship through student clubs and committees like Apekshaa and Pupil for Pupil Committee (PPC) respectively.

Prakruthi, the campus wildlife and animal welfare club, champions environmental and individual well-being. The Omega Science and Spirituality Club (Lifestyle Club) supports holistic issues at personal levels. The Social Responsibility Club organizes wide-reaching societal awareness campaigns and TaskForce looks after student administrative welfare.

Academic Societies

The college is a host to many academic societies both national and international. These societies organize several workshops, seminars and guest lectures by eminent personalities in their respective fields, from time to time. They are also responsible for providing opportunities for students to take part in various international events too. The academic society includes IEEE, ACM, ISA and SAE.

Competition Teams

NIT Trichy is home to prominent multidisciplinary competition teams, notably Orbit NITT and Force Hyperloop. Orbit NITT serves as the institute's official rocketry team. Representing the college in global aerospace engineering competitions like the Latin American Space Challenge (LASC), the team has notably developed its own student-made rocket motor. Meanwhile, Force Hyperloop is a research and development team dedicated to advancing next-generation transit technology. The team develops functional hyperloop pod prototypes and competes internationally, participating in events such as the European Hyperloop Week and the Global Hyperloop Competition.

Computing Groups

The two computing groups are the Delta Force and Spider. The Delta Force is an active group of developers and programmers who are responsible for the maintenance of the institute website and the development, administration, and updating of most of the content on the institute intranet. The Spider group offers various services such as organizing various courses (c language, web designing etc.), blog hosting, providing short message services and now even the facility to check train reservation status.

Technical Clubs

The hobby groups include RMI, PSI, Designer's Consortium, Graphique,Nakshatra and The Third Dimension.

The RMI (Robotics and Machines Intelligence) is the on-campus robotics group, primarily involved in the development of robotics enthusiasm amongst the students. The group is responsible for holding workshops and organizing competition events in electronics.

PSI Racing is the official Motorsport Club of NIT-T. They work hands-on to build an All-Terrain Vehicle (ATV) from scratch to compete in BAJA, an Intercollegiate design competition organized by the Society of Automotive Engineers INDIA (SAEINDIA).

Graphique, the official graphic designing club of NIT Trichy, aims to spread the message of Design Thinking. Its activities are primarily centered around creating artworks for the institute's festivals - Festember and Pragyan. Graphique also takes up campus development initiatives to help everyone learn Graphic Design through workshops

Business, Finance and Consulting Clubs

Finance Clubs like ProffNITT, Sigma and the NITT Chapter of IFSA are also active on campus. The college also has 180DC NITT- The NIT Trichy branch of the world's largest student-based consultancy firm.

Fine Arts Groups

The fine arts groups include the Dance Troupe (dance club), Music Troupe (music club), Thespians' Society (drama club), Pixelbug (Photography Club), and Visual Arts Club. These groups have won various awards in several events conducted in different colleges held around the country.

Literary, Debate, and Sociology Clubs

Balls by Picasso is the Official English Literary and Debating Society of NIT Trichy. The members of the club participate and win a variety of events like quizzes, word games, puzzles, JAM and other speaking events around the country in cultural, technical and quizzing festivals.

Athenaeum is the Political Science and MUN club of NIT Trichy. It conducts and participates in South Indian MUN circuits on behalf of the National Institute of Technology, Tiruchirappalli, along with writing op-ed pieces about national and international politics.

Language Clubs

There are several Language Clubs which cater to the needs of native speakers. Aayaam (The Hindi Club of NIT Trichy) conducts many Literary events in all major college fests, the flagship event "Umang" conducted every year for the celebration of "Hindi Divas", It also organizes "Dandiya Night" during Navratri and publishes a yearly magazine called "Pratibimb", It also organizes Hindi learning classes for non-Hindi speakers who show a keen interest in learning the language.

Tamil Mandram (Tamil language promoting club) plays a very important role in promoting Tamil amongst the students by organizing various programs, Tamil events in cultural festivals and also book fairs where classics are available at subsidized prices.

=== Annual Events ===
==== Festember ====
Festember is the annual national-level cultural festival of the institute. Held every year since 1975 during the month of September, this event encompasses music, dance and literary competitions, with thousands of participants from colleges all over the country vying for the trophy. The event has seen performances by Indian musicians including Karthik, Srinivas, Naresh Iyer, Jonita Gandhi, Neeti Mohan, Kadri Gopalnath, Sivamani and Benny Dayal as well as bands like Indian Ocean, Euphoria and Silk Route. 'ProNites' or 'ProShows', Festember's most anticipated events, usually form the grand finale after the valediction ceremony. Also on the agenda are the various literary competitions split up between English, Hindi and Tamil, along with the cultural and arts events. Festember derives its name from the phrase, "A Fest to Remember" and not from "A-Fest in September" as is popularly believed due to its falling in the month of September every year.

==== Pragyan ====
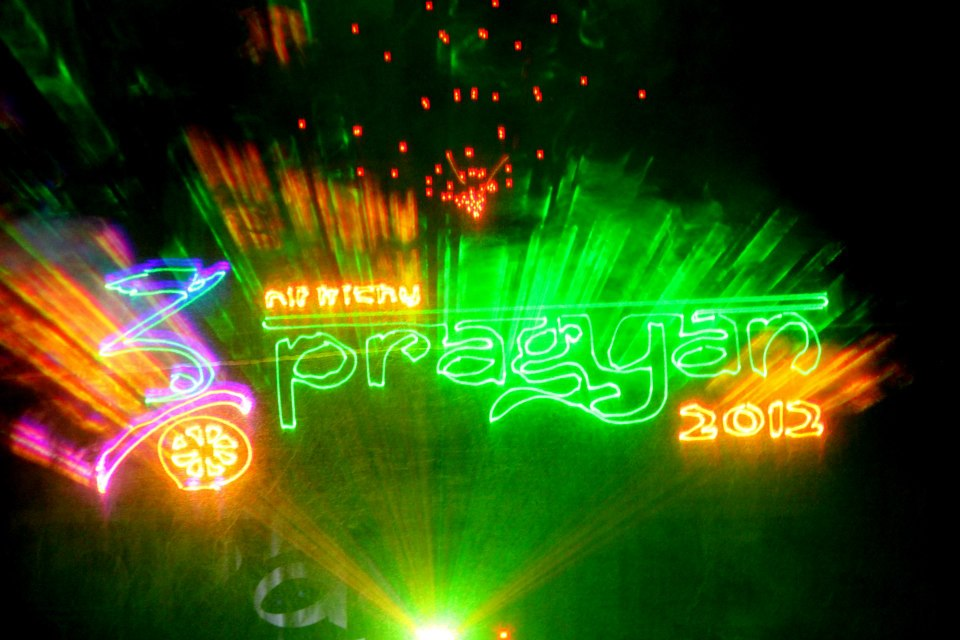
Laser show during Pragyan (festival) 2012

Pragyan, the ISO 9001 & 20121 certified annual international techno-management organization of the NIT Trichy has more than 47 events spanning across eight genres.

==== Nittfest ====
Nittfest is the annual inter-departmental cultural competition of the institute. It is usually conducted in March or generally before Pragyan. During Nittfest, departments square off against each other over four days to battle over various events like quizzes, debates, music, dance, drama, gaming, art etc.

==== Sports Fete ====
Sports Fete is the annual inter-departmental sports competition of the institute. It is usually conducted in September. The competition is among the departments competing in various indoor and outdoor sports. Events like athletics, football, cricket and hockey have more points to score. The department with the highest total points wins the Sports Fete trophy. The Mechanical Engineering Department has won the most titles, beating the Computer Science Department by a marginal difference.

==== Aaveg ====
Aaveg is the annual, exclusive inter-hostel cultural and sports competition for first-year undergraduate students at NIT Tiruchirappalli. It serves as the primary orientation and integration platform, fostering community and allowing freshers to showcase their talents. Students compete fiercely under their respective hostel banners—Garnet A, Agate, Garnet B, Opal C, and Beryl—across sports, cultural, gaming, and literary events for the overall championship trophy.

=== Department Symposiums ===
Every academic department of NIT Trichy conducts a symposium every year which is a kind of technical festival. Spread over two days, the symposiums usually include paper presentations, guest lectures, workshops and various other events pertaining to the central theme each department has decided on for the year.

Department	Symposium(s)
Architecture	Archcult
Chemical Engineering	Alchemy
Chemistry	Horizon
Civil Engineering	Moments
Computer Applications	Version
Computer Science and Engineering	Vortex
Electrical and Electronics Engineering	Currents
Electronics and Communication Engineering	Probe
Energy and Environment	First Year Expo
Instrumentation and Control Engineering	Sensors
Management Studies	Bizzdom, Nisadya
Mathematics	Exponentia
Mechanical Engineering	Synergy
Metallurgical and Materials Engineering	Mettle
Physics	InPhyNITT, Quality
Production Engineering	Prodigy

== Notable alumni ==
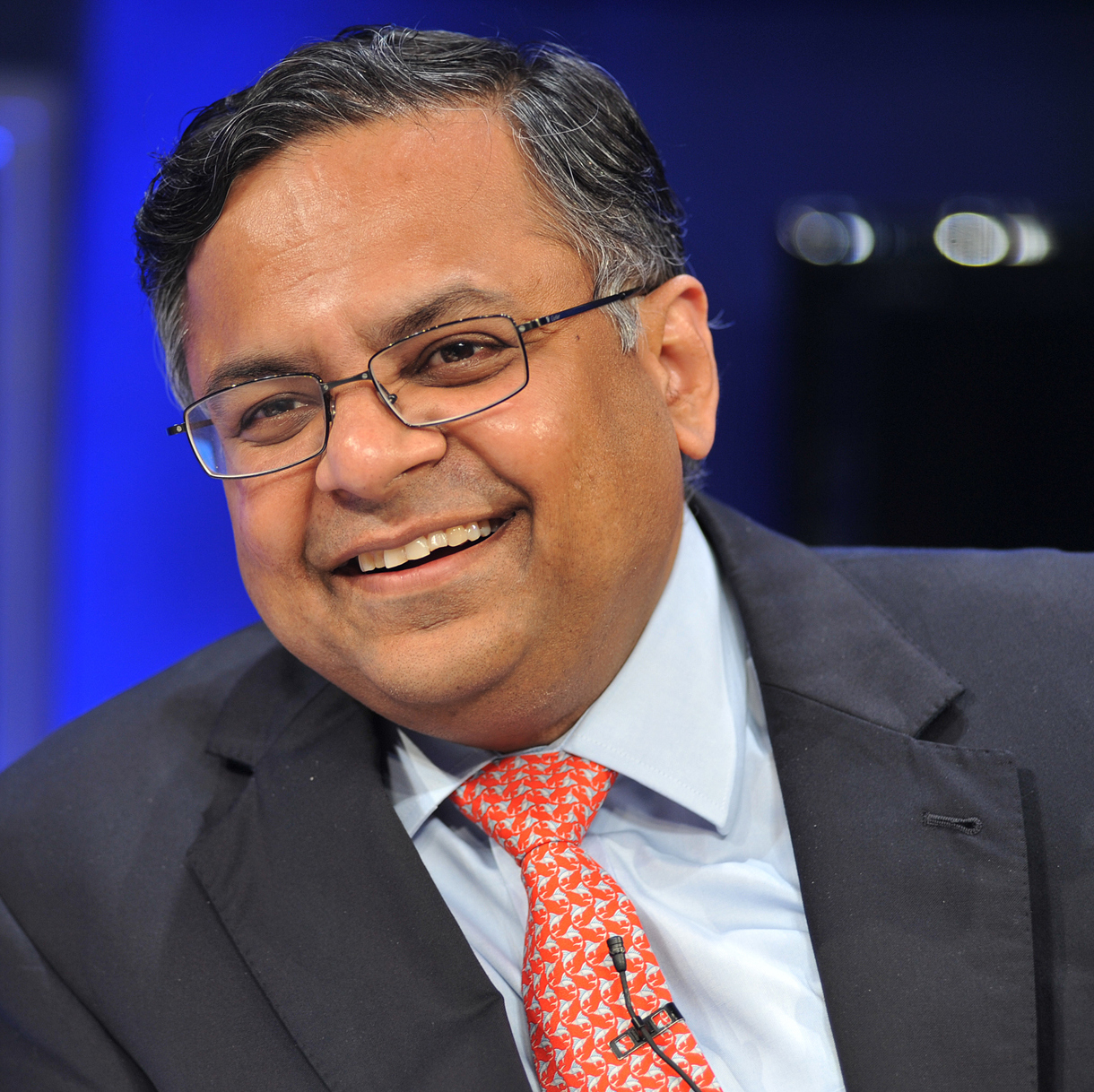
Natarajan Chandrasekaran, chairman of Tata Sons and Tata Group

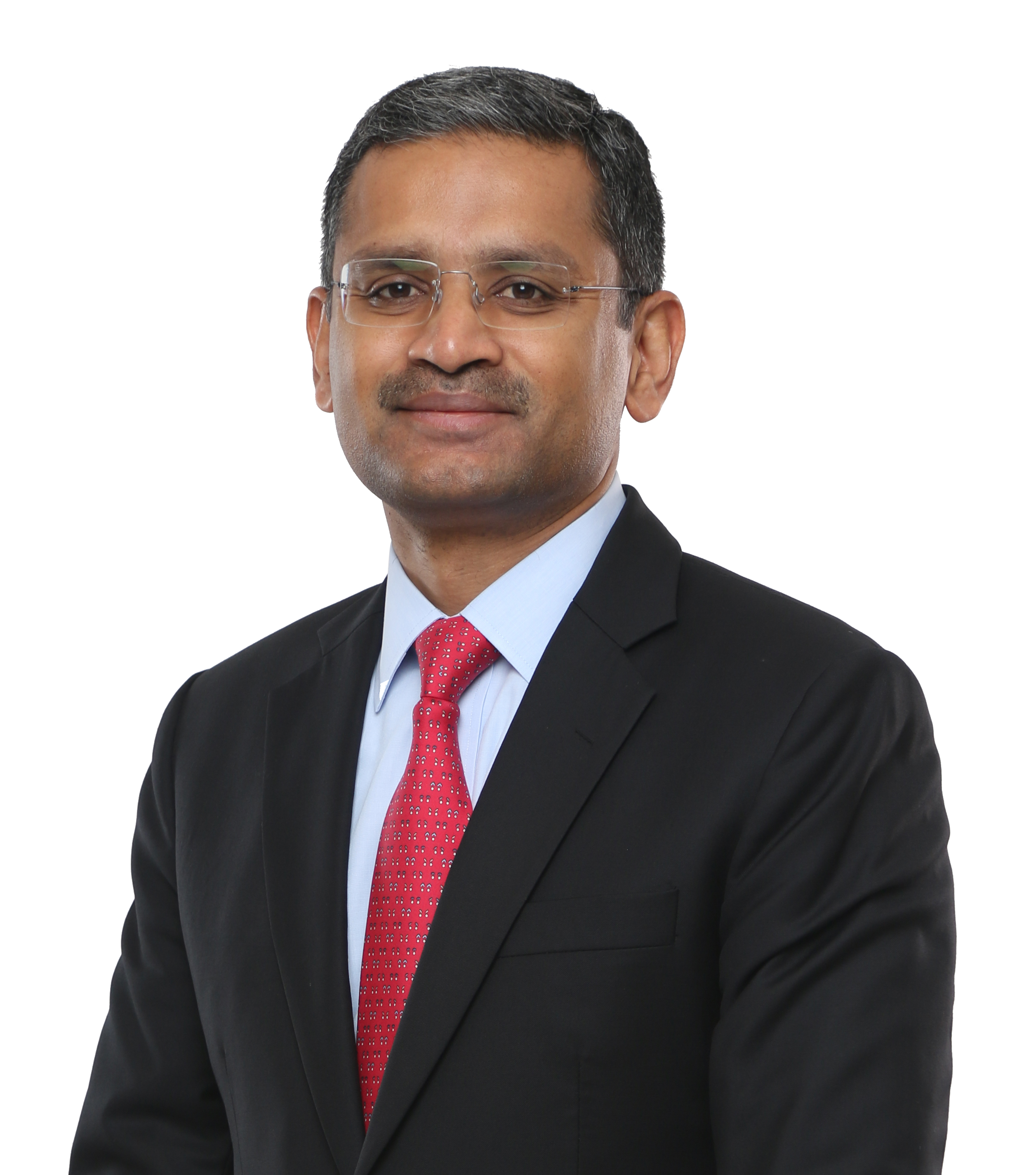
Rajesh Gopinathan, former CEO of Tata Consultancy Services

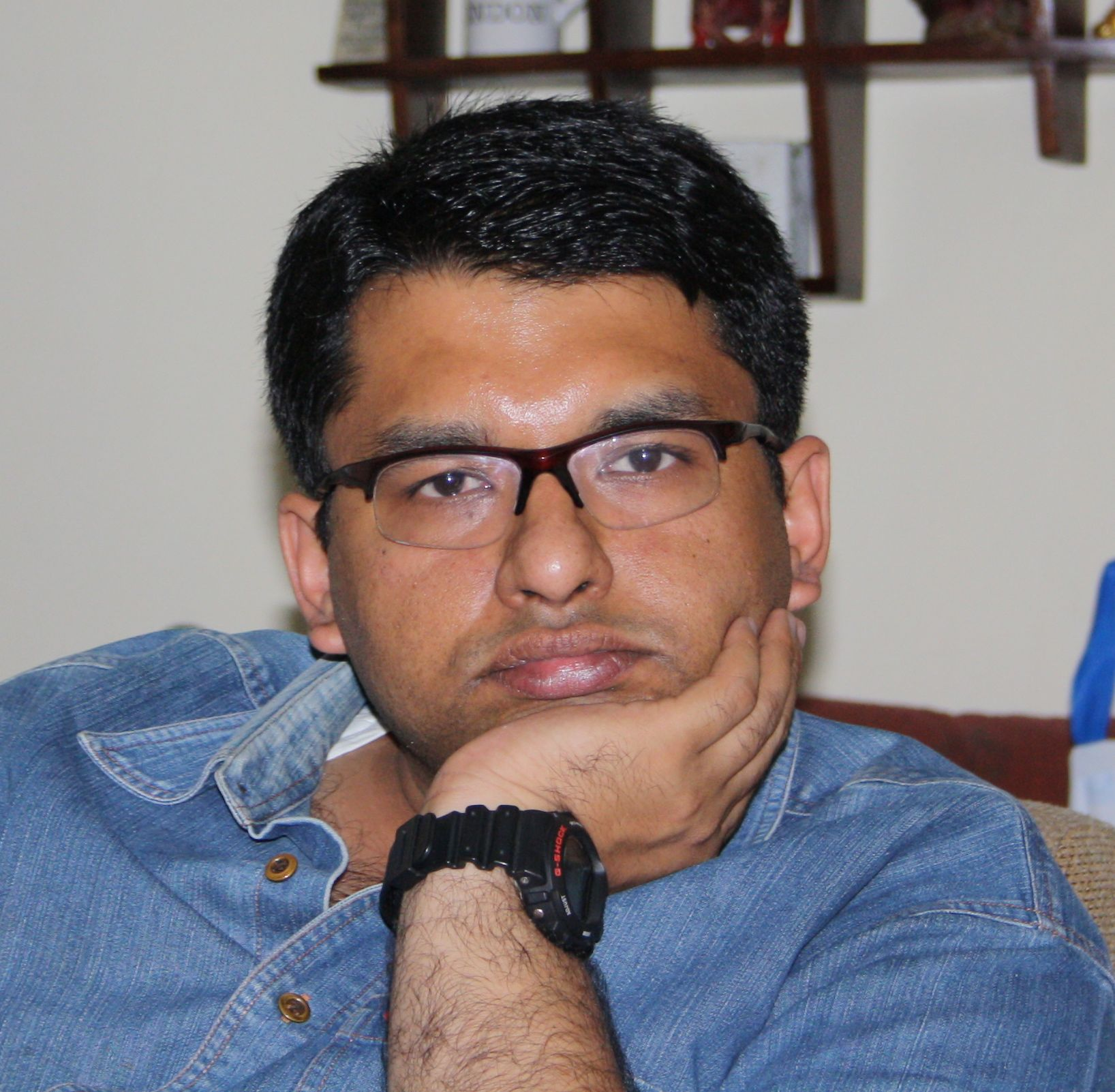
Sidin Vadukut, former managing director of Mint

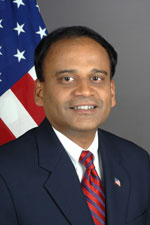
Rajkumar Chellaraj, CFO and associate dean of the Stanford Graduate School of Business

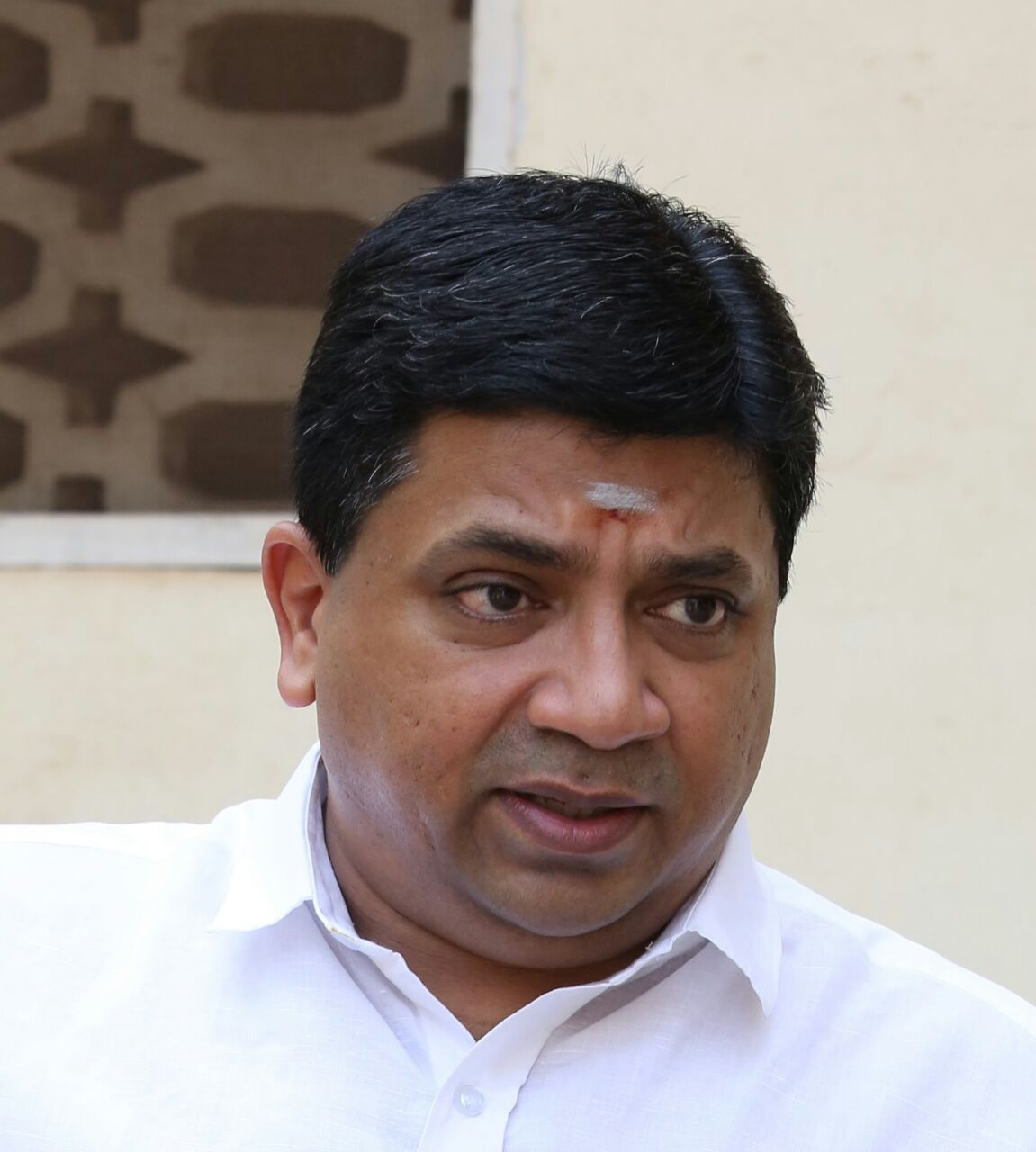
Palanivel Thiagarajan, Minister of Information Technology and Digital Services of Tamil Nadu

Satya Prabhakar, CEO of Sulekha

National Institute of Technology, Tiruchirappalli alumni include chief executive officers and top executives of Fortune India 500 and Forbes Global 2000 companies such as Natarajan Chandrasekaran, chairman of Tata Sons; Rajesh Gopinathan, former CEO and managing director of Tata Consultancy Services; T. V. Narendran, CEO and managing director of Tata Steel; K. R. Sridhar, CEO and founder of Bloom Energy and R. Ravimohan, former executive director of Reliance Industries.

In the academic world, they include deans and chairs of faculties such as Nagi Naganathan, president of the Oregon Institute of Technology; Guruswami Ravichandran, chair of the Division of Engineering and Applied Science and Professor of Aerospace and Mechanical Engineering at the California Institute of Technology; Ramesh R. Rao, director of the California Institute for Telecommunications and Information Technology and Professor of Electrical and Computer Engineering at the University of California, San Diego; Nambirajan Seshadri, Professor of Practice of Electrical and Computer Engineering at the University of California, San Diego; Rajkumar Chellaraj, CFO and associate dean of the Stanford Graduate School of Business; Venkat Selvamanickam, Professor of Mechanical Engineering and Physics, director of the Texas Center for Superconductivity at the University of Houston; and Nagarajan Ranganathan, Distinguished Professor of Computer Science and Engineering at the University of South Florida.

== See also ==
- National Institutes of Technology
