= R. Ravimohan =

- Born: 1957
- Died: 28 December 2009 (aged 52)
- Education: National Institute of Technology, Tiruchirappalli
- Occupation: Corporate executive

R. Ravimohan (1957–2009) was an Indian corporate executive of financial and risk management. He was known for his credit rating analysis. He worked with Credit Rating Information Services of India Limited and was with Reliance Industries as its executive director.

== Early life ==
He received his bachelor's degree in chemical engineering from Regional Engineering College, Tiruchirappalli (now, known as National Institute of Technology, Tiruchirappalli). He then attended a six-week Advanced Management Program at the Harvard Business School. Ravimohan married Madhuraleckshmi and they had 2 children together - a daughter Hridya and a son Jagad.

== Career ==
Ravimohan started his career with ICICI Ltd where he worked in project appraisal, systems designing, credit administration and merchant banking. He was the youngest team member in the project finance department at ICICI. He also worked with Over-the-Counter Exchange of India (OTCEI).

He spent 16 years with Credit Rating Information Services of India Limited, now the India arm of global ratings major Standard & Poor's (S&P). He developed a unique tool of internal communication — Ravi’s Rantings. He held the position of Managing Director and Region Head of Standard & Poor's for the South and South-East Asia.

Ravimohan joined the Reliance Industries’ board in August as an executive director and was involved in the company’s bid for the petrochemicals maker LyondellBasell Industries.

He was member, Primary Market Advisory Committee of Sebi, Technical Advisory Committee and Financial Stability and Stern Test Assessment of Committee of Reserve Bank of India.

== Death ==
He was rushed to hospital after he suffered a cardiac arrest while taking a walk outside his office. He died on 28 December 2009.
