= Ramesh R. Rao =

- Born: Bihar, India
- Citizenship: United States (Naturalized)
- Education: B.E. electronics and communications, 1980, NIT Trichy, M.S., 1982 and Ph.D., 1984 in electrical engineering, University of Maryland, College Park
- Alma mater: De Nobili School, FRI, National Institute of Technology, Tiruchirappalli, University of Maryland, College Park
- Occupation: Director of California Institute for Telecommunications and Information Technology
- Organization: University of California, San Diego

Ramesh R. Rao is currently the director of the California Institute for Telecommunications and Information Technology, a division of the University of California, San Diego. He was appointed as the first holder of the Qualcomm Endowed Chair in Telecommunications and Information Technologies in 2004 in the department of Electrical and Computer Engineering of the Jacobs School of Engineering at University of California, San Diego where he has been a faculty member since 1984.

== Education ==
He earned his Bachelor of Engineering (B.E.) degree with honors in electronics and communication engineering in 1980 from the Regional Engineering College, Tiruchirappalli (now known as National Institute of Technology, Tiruchirappalli) India. He earned his Master of Science (M.S.) in 1982 and Doctorate of Philosophy (PhD) in electrical engineering in 1984 both from the University of Maryland, College Park. In 2008, the National Institute of Technology Tiruchirappalli awarded him their Distinguished Alumnus Award. Professor Ramesh Rao was educated at De Nobili School, FRI, Dhanbad in the Indian state of now in Jharkhand which was earlier a part of Bihar.

== Selected publications ==
- M. Zorzi, R. R. Rao : Geographic random forwarding (GeRaF) for ad hoc and sensor networks: multihop performance - IEEE Transactions on Mobile Computing 2 (4), 337–348
- V. Srinivasan, P Nuggehalli, C. F. Chiasserini, R. R. Rao : Cooperation in Wireless Ad Hoc Networks - IEEE INFOCOM 2003. vol:2 pg:808 -817
- M. Zorzi, R. R. Rao : On the statistics of block errors in bursty channels - IEEE transactions on communications 45 (6), 660–667
- R. R. Rao, A. Ephremides : On the stability of interacting queues in a multiple-access system - IEEE Transactions on Information Theory, 1988
