= P. S. Manisundaram =

Indian educationist

1st Principal of the National Institute of Technology, Tiruchirappalli
- In office 1964–1982

Personal details
- Born: 9 December 1927 Mandalay, Myanmar
- Died: 26 October 2013 (aged 85) Chennai, India
- Education: Loyola College, Chennai; Nova Scotia University

P. S. Manisundaram (9 December 1927 – 26 October 2013) was an Indian educationist and pioneer of computer science education.

== Early life and education ==
He was born in Mandalay, Myanmar (Burma). He graduated from Loyola College, Chennai (Madras), Tamil Nadu, India. He did a master's degree in civil engineering at Nova Scotia University, Canada, in 1958.

== Career ==
After completing master's degree studies in civil engineering at Nova Scotia University, Canada, in 1958, he returned to Tamil Nadu and started his career as a lecturer at Alagappa Chettiar College of Engineering and Technology, Karaikudi, Tamil Nadu. He was the first principal of the Regional Engineering College (currently the National Institute of Technology Tiruchirappalli), Tamil Nadu. He became the first vice chancellor of the Bharathidasan University, Tiruchirappalli, Tamil Nadu, when the university was created in 1982. Manisundaram was associated with many universities and educational institutions in India and around the world. He was conferred Doctor of Engineering (Honoris Causa) by Dalhousie University (Formerly Technical University of Nova Scotia), Halifax, Canada in 1984. He died in Chennai, India, on 26 October 2013.
