= Mini Shaji Thomas =

Director at NIT Trichy 2016 - 2021

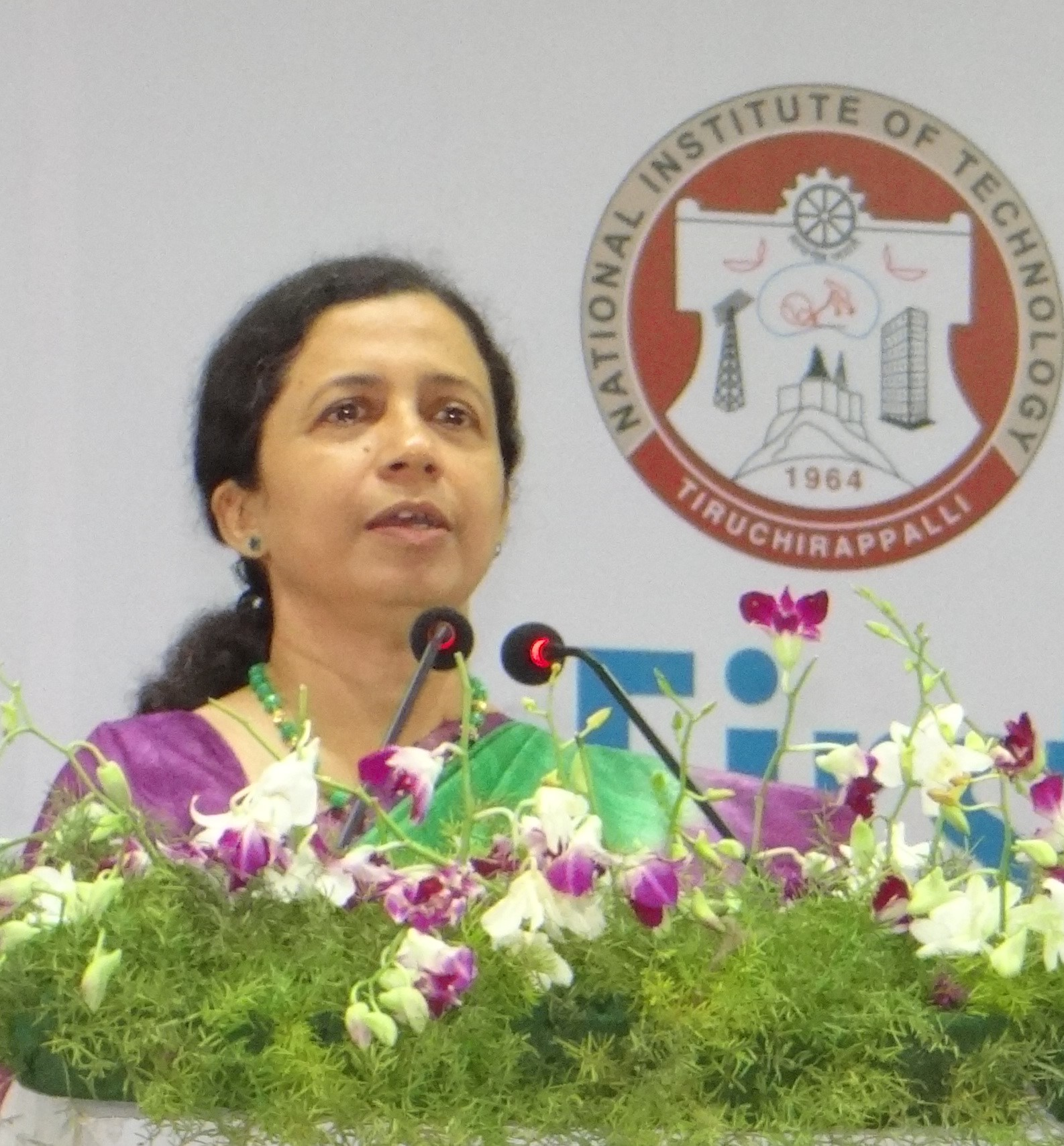

8th Director of the National Institute of Technology, Tiruchirappalli
- In office 2016–2021

Personal details
- Born: 1962 (age 63–64) Kerala, India
- Education: University of Kerala; Indian Institute of Technology, Madras; Indian Institute of Technology, Delhi

Mini Shaji Thomas (born 1962) is an Indian electrical engineer who served as the director of the National Institute of Technology, Tiruchirappalli from 2016 to 2021. She was the eighth director and first female director of the institute since its founding in 1964. She was the Dean of the Faculty of Engineering and Technology at Jamia Millia Islamia in New Delhi and currently Professor in the Department of Electrical Engineering.

== Education ==
Thomas graduated with a degree in electrical engineering from the University of Kerala in 1984, where she was awarded a gold medal for academic performance. She then completed M.Tech in Electrical Engineering (energy systems) from IIT Madras in 1986, where she again received a gold medal and was awarded the Siemens Prize. In 1991, she earned her PhD in Electrical Engineering (power systems) from IIT Delhi.

== Career ==
As Dean of the Faculty of Engineering and Technology at Jamia Millia Islamia, Thomas oversaw the introduction of three B.Tech programs in new fields and revisions to the curriculum aligned with the National Education Policy 2020. She was the founding director of the Centre for Innovation and Entrepreneurship at Jamia Millia Islamia and is a professor in the Department of Electrical Engineering, Faculty of Engineering and Technology. Thomas served as the Central Public Information Officer from 2008 to 2014 and as Head of the Department of Electrical Engineering from 2005 to 2008. Before joining Jamia, she was a faculty member at Delhi College of Engineering, Delhi and the National Institute of Technology, Calicut.

At the National Institute of Technology, Tiruchirappalli, Thomas and her team developed a strategic plan for the institute that included input from multiple stakeholders. In 2018, NIT Trichy established a Centre for Excellence in Manufacturing, with an investment of ₹190 crore in collaboration with Siemens Industry Software, to support research and training. The institute also set up a Centre of Excellence in Artificial Intelligence and Intelligent Machines.

Thomas serves on the Board of Directors of the US-India Science and Technology Endowment Fund (USISTEF). She was President of the Shastri-Indo Canadian Institute (SICI) from 2020 to 2021, a binational organization supported by the Ministry of Education, Government of India, which promotes academic exchange between India and Canada. She also served as the Mentor Director of the Indian Institute of Information Technology, Tiruchirappalli for three years.

== Research contributions ==
Thomas's research interests include Supervisory Control and Data Acquisition systems, substation and distribution automation, and smart grids. She has published more than 150 research papers in international journals and conferences, supervised 18 doctoral students, and coordinated research projects, including the Special Assistance Program (SAP) on Power System Automation supported by the UGC, Government of India. She also serves as a reviewer for academic journals in her field.

She established laboratories for SCADA and Substation Automation at Jamia Millia Islamia, with industry collaboration. In 2003, she drafted the curriculum and launched a full-time M.Tech program in Electrical Power System Management at the Faculty of Engineering & Technology, Jamia Millia Islamia, which incorporated industry participation and practical training. Thomas received the IEEE Educational Activities Board (EAB) Meritorious Achievement Award in 2015 for contributions to curriculum and laboratory development in the electricity sector.

She is the author of Power System SCADA and Smart Grids (CRC Press, 2017), and contributed a chapter to the McGraw-Hill Standard Handbook of Electrical Engineers, 17th edition (2018). She has also authored a chapter in Women in Power: Research and Development Advances in Electric Power Systems (Springer, 2023).

Thomas is a Distinguished Lecturer of the IEEE Power & Energy Society. She has served on the global boards of IEEE, representing the Asia-Pacific region, and has delivered lectures at universities internationally.

== Awards ==
- Distinguished Alumnus Award of Indian Institute of Technology, Madras (IITM) 2022 [33]
- Outstanding Power Engineer award by IEEE Power and Energy Society Delhi in 2008.
- MGA Innovation Award by IEEE Member and Geographic Activities Board, USA in 2008.
- Outstanding Power and Energy Chapter Chair by IEEE Power and Energy Society, USA in 2012.
- Larry K Wilson Trans-National Award by IEEE Member and Geographic Activities Board, USA in 2013.
- IEEE EAB Meritorious Achievement Award in Continuing Education for "Design and development of curriculum and laboratory facilities for professionals and Students in the Electric Utility Industry" by IEEE Educational Activities Board, USA in 2015.
- Best Teacher Award by IEEE Kerala Section in 2019.
- Recipient of the Distinguished Alumnus Award (DAA) of IIT Madras 2022.

In addition, Thomas received the 'Career Award' for young teachers from the Government of India, the IEEE Power and Energy Society Outstanding Chapter Chair Award 2013, the IEEE Member and Geographic Activities (MGA) Innovation Award 2008, the IEEE Outstanding Volunteer Award 2005, the IEEE Outstanding Branch counselor Award 2002, and the Power and Energy Society (PES) Outstanding Chapter Engineer Award. She is a certified trainer for the Capacity Building of Women Managers in Higher Education by UGC and has conducted training sessions for women's empowerment.
