= Venkat Selvamanickam =

- Born: Tamil Nadu, India
- Education: B.E, M.S (Mechanical Engineering) in 1986 and 1988 respectively, PhD (Materials Engineering) in 1992
- Alma mater: National Institute of Technology, Tiruchirappalli; University of Houston
- Occupations: Jointly appointed professor of Chemical Engineering, Mechanical Engineering, Materials Engineering and Physics
- Organization(s): Texas Center for Superconductivity, University of Houston

Venkat Selvamanickam is the M.D Anderson Chair Professor of Mechanical Engineering and a Professor of Physics at the University of Houston. He is also the Director of the Applied Research Hub of the Texas Center for Superconductivity at the University of Houston.

== Education ==
Venkat Selvamanickam received his Bachelor of Engineering (B.E.) degree with honors in mechanical engineering from Regional Engineering College, Tiruchirappalli (now known as National Institute of Technology, Tiruchirappalli) in 1986. He then received Master of Science (M.S.) degree in mechanical engineering and Doctorate of Philosophy (PhD) in materials engineering from University of Houston in 1988 and 1992 respectively.

== Career ==
He was a post doctoral fellow at the Texas Center for Superconductivity from September 1992 to April 1993. He then worked as Research Associate at Oak Ridge National Laboratory from May 1993 to May 1994. From May 1994 to August 2008, he served as the Vice President and Chief Technology Officer SuperPower Inc., a Furukawa Electric company. He is now a professor of Chemical Engineering, Mechanical Engineering, Materials Engineering and Physics at the University of Houston since September 2008.

== Awards ==
- Senior Researcher Award in Cullen College of Engineering, University of Houston 2012.
- Chosen by Houston Chronicle as one of "11 of the greater Houston area's top scientific minds" to author articles on 11 promising technologies for the coming years.
- Distinguished Alumnus Award from National Institute of Technology, Tiruchirappalli in 2014.
