= Rajesh Gopinathan =

Indian business executive

Rajesh
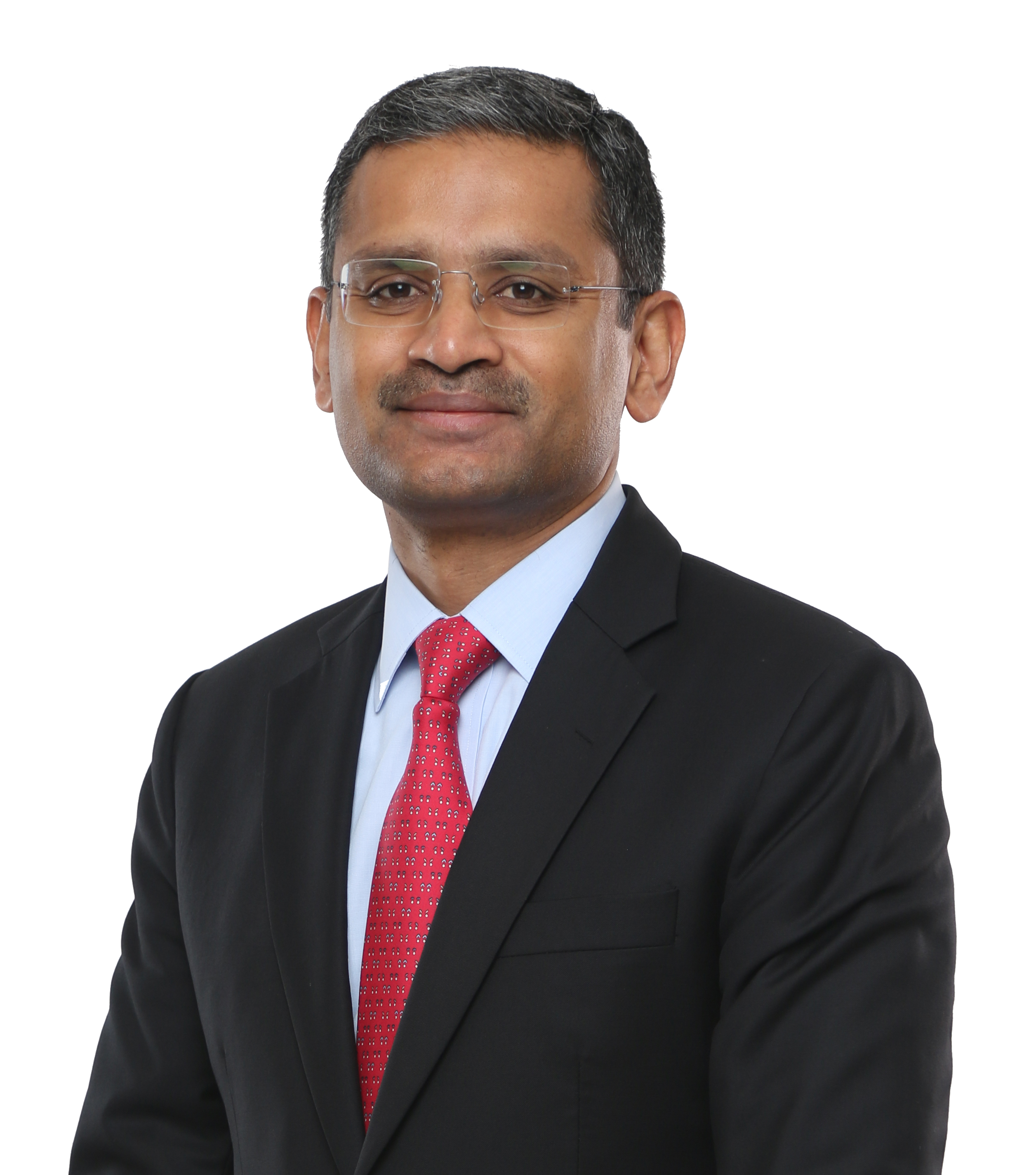
- Born: Kerala, India
- Education: St. Francis' College; St. Mary's Convent Inter College, RDSO Manak Nagar Lucknow; NIT Tiruchirappalli (B.Eng.); IIM Ahmedabad (MBA)
- Occupation: Professor of Practice IIT Bombay
- Known for: Former CEO of Tata Consultancy Services

Rajesh Gopinathan (born 1971) is an Indian Executive who was former CEO and MD of Tata Consultancy Services (TCS), an Indian IT services and consulting organization and one of the country's largest employers. He was elevated to Chief Executive in February 2017, having been the Chief Financial Officer since 2013. At time of his appointment, Rajesh was one of the youngest CEOs in the Tata Group.

== Early life ==
=== Education ===
Rajesh did his schooling from St. Mary's Convent School (RDSO) and St. Francis' College, Lucknow, graduating from school in 1987. Rajesh graduated in 1994 with an Electrical and Electronics Engineering degree from the Regional Engineering College, Tiruchirappalli (now National Institute of Technology, Tiruchirappalli). In 1996, he obtained a post-graduate diploma in Management (PGDM, equivalent to an MBA) from Indian Institute of Management Ahmedabad.

== Career ==
=== Tata Strategic Management Group ===
He joined the Tata Strategic Management Group in 1996, where he worked on multiple assignments with Tata companies.

=== Tata Consultancy Services ===
In 2001, Rajesh joined Tata Consultancy Services from the Tata Industries and worked to drive TCS’ newly established e-business unit in the United States. He was involved in the design, structure and implementation of the new organizational structure and operating model of the company. Rajesh took over as the Chief Financial Officer of the company in 2013. Prior to this role, he was Vice President – Business Finance, where he was responsible for the financial management of the company's individual operating units. After working as the Chief Financial Officer of the company for 4 years, he was elevated to Chief Executive Officer in February 2017.

Rajesh has played a key role in helping TCS become a 22 billion global company at the end of fiscal year 2020. With over 469,000 associates, TCS is one of the largest private sector employers globally and was recognized as a Global Top Employer for the sixth consecutive year in 2021, with the highest retention rate in a competitive industry.

Under Rajesh's leadership, the market capitalization of the company crossed US$100 billion during April 2018, making TCS the most valuable company in India. In 2021, TCS’ brand value grew by $1.4 billion over the prior year to US$15 billion and was ranked among the Top 3 most valuable brands in the IT Services sector globally according to the Brand Finance 2021 report.

==== Resignation from TCS ====
He resigned as chief executive officer, effective 31 May 2023. He was replaced by K.Krithivasan, the company's president and global head of banking, financial services and insurance (BFSI) vertical, who has been named CEO-designate effective 16 March 2023. Describing his journey at TCS, he said it had been an absolute privilege to lead the company, and the last six years have seen tremendous growth and transformation for all.

=== IIT Bombay ===
He joined IIT Bombay as a professor of practice and head of Translational Research & Entrepreneurship.

== Awards and recognition ==
- 2021 - India's Best CEO in the category of Super large companies by Business Today (India)
- 2020 - Outstanding Business Leader of the Year - CNBC TV18 India Business Leader Awards’ (IBLA)
- 2019 - Management Man of the Year - 40th Bombay Management Association Corporate Leadership and Academic Awards
- 2019 - CEO Force for Good Award - Globe by CECP
- 2018 - Best CEO (First Place) - Institutional Investor's 2018 All Asia Executive Team Rankings
- 2014 - Young Alumni Achiever's Award - Corporate Leader Category Indian Institute of Management Ahmedabad
