= Sidin Vadukut =

Sidin Sunny Vadukut
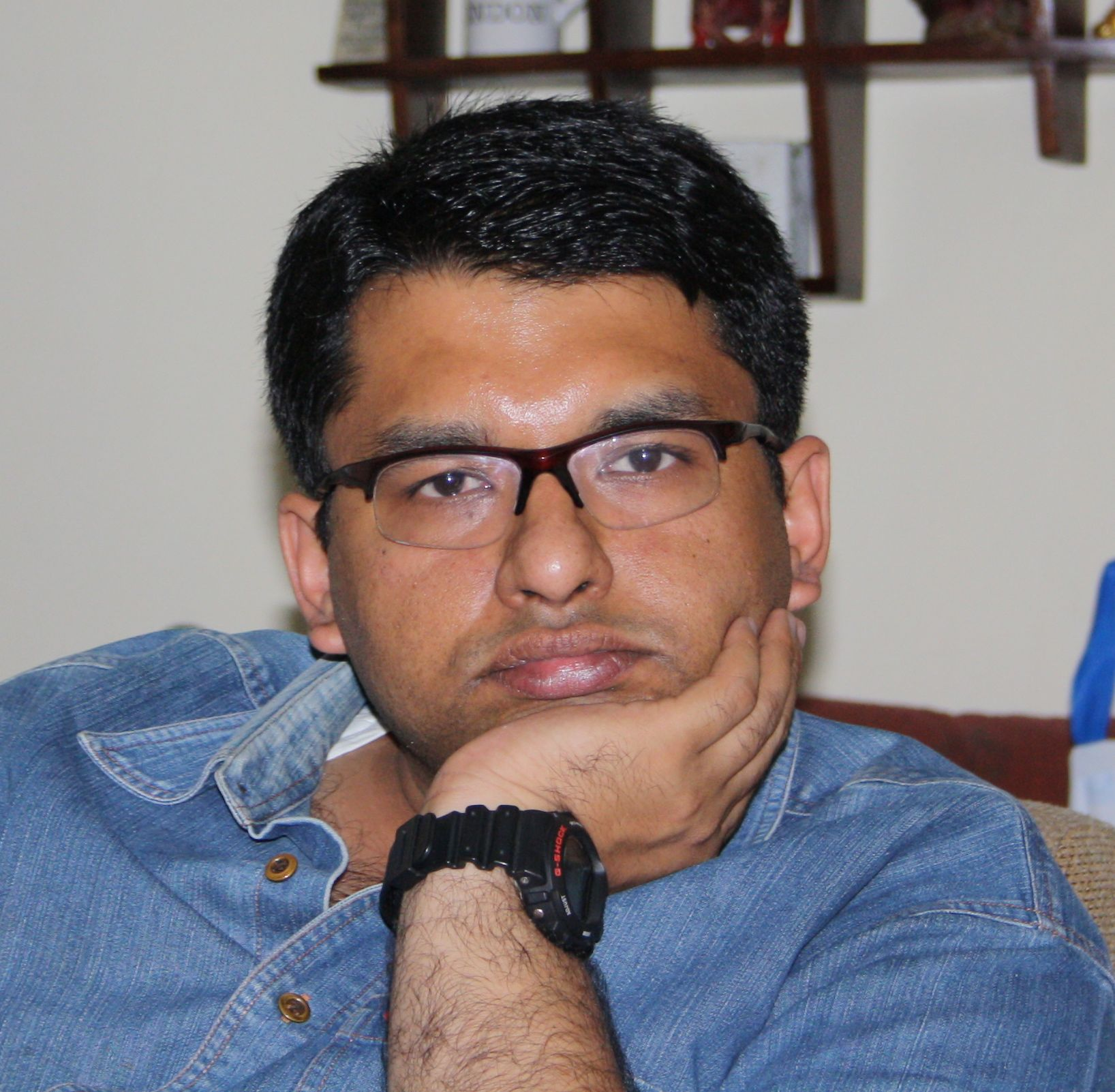
- Born: 1979 (age 46–47); Irinjalakuda, Kerala
- Education: MA, MBA, BE.
- Alma mater: Birkbeck, University of London; Indian Institute of Management, Ahmedabad, National Institute of Technology, Tiruchirappalli
- Known for: Managing editor of Livemint.com
- Spouse: Ruchika Kapoor
- Website: www.whatay.com

Sidin Sunny Vadukut is a columnist, writer and blogger from India. In January 2010, Vadukut's debut novel Dork: The Incredible Adventures of Robin 'Einstein' Varghese was published. This is the first part of the Dork trilogy and takes a satirical dig at the management consulting industry. The second installment in the trilogy – God Save the Dork – set in London was released in November 2011. The final edition – Who let the Dork Out – was out in the markets on 4 November 2012.

== Personal life ==
In September 2014 he appeared as a contestant on the BBC quiz show Mastermind. His specialist subject was champagne.

== Works ==
Vadukut has written three books that comprise the Dork trilogy. The trilogy belong to the genre described as Office humor. The trilogy comprises DORK: The Incredible Adventures of Robin ‘Einstein' Varghese, God Save The Dork and Who Let The Dork Out?

In 2014, Vadukut published his first non fiction book The Sceptical Patriot: Exploring the Truths Behind the Zero and Other Indian Glories.

Vadukut contributes articles to various websites including Mint and ESPN CricInfo
