= Nagarajan Ranganathan =

Indian professor (1961–2018)

- Born: Thanjavur, India
- Education: B.E. (Honors), PhD
- Alma mater: National Institute of Technology, Tiruchirappalli; University of Central Florida
- Occupations: Distinguished Professor of Computer Science and Engineering
- Organization: University of South Florida

Nagarajan Ranganathan (30 Mar 1961 – 25 October 2018) was a Distinguished University Professor of Computer Science and Engineering at the University of South Florida, Tampa, United States. He was elected as a Fellow of IEEE in 2002 for his contributions to algorithms and architectures for VLSI systems. He was elected Fellow of AAAS in 2012. He served as the Editor-in-Chief of IEEE Transactions on VLSI Systems.

== Education ==
Nagarajan Ranganathan received Bachelor of Engineering (B.E.) degree with honors in Electrical and Electronics Engineering from Regional Engineering College, Tiruchirappalli (now known as National Institute of Technology, Tiruchirappalli), formerly affiliated University of Madras, India and Doctorate of Philosophy (PhD) degree in Computer Science from the University of Central Florida, Orlando in 1988.

== Career ==
He was a Professor at the University of South Florida during 1988 to 2019, for over 30 years. For a brief period, he was a professor of Electrical and Computer Engineering at the University of Texas at El Paso during 1998–99. He has co-authored over 295 papers in refereed journals and conferences, five book chapters and co-owns eight U.S. patents and two pending.

Ranganathan at ISVLSI 2012 with some of his former students including Saraju Mohanty and Vijaykrishnan Narayanan.

Ranganathan has mentored over 31 Ph.D. students and 80 M.S. Thesis students during his career spanning for 30 years for their research.

== Awards ==
- University of South Florida Distinguished University Professor honorific title and the university gold medallion honor (2007).
- Distinguished Alumnus Award, National Institute of Technology, Tiruchirappalli (Regional Engineering College, Tiruchirappalli), India, 2009.
- IEEE Circuits and Systems Society VLSI Transactions Best Paper Award (2009).
- Served as the Faculty Liaison on the Academics and Campus Environment (ACE) Group of the University Of South Florida Board of Trustees (2011-2013).
