= California Institute for Telecommunications and Information Technology =

UC research institution

Coordinates: 32.882679°N 117.234545°W

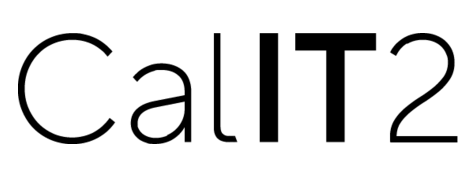
- Parent institution: University of California; UC San Diego; UC Irvine; UC Riverside
- Established: 2000
- Focus: Technology (e.g. nanotechnology, Wireless, photonics, cyberinfrastructure ) to advance health, energy, culture and the environment.
- Director: Ramesh R. Rao, interim (CalIT2); Ramesh Rao (UC San Diego); G. P. Li (UCI); Shane Cybart (UCR)
- Location: La Jolla, California; Irvine, California; Riverside, California
- Website: https://calit2.org

The California Institute for Telecommunications and Information Technology (CalIT2, previously Calit2, Cal(IT)^{2}), also referred to as the Qualcomm Institute (QI) at its San Diego branch, is a collaborative academic research institution of the University of California San Diego (UC San Diego), the University of California, Irvine (UCI), and University of California, Riverside. CalIT2 was established in 2000 as one of the four UC Gray Davis Institutes for Science and Innovation. As a multidisciplinary research institution, it is conducting research and educational programming in emerging technologies to improve the state's economy and citizens' quality of life, while addressing large-scale societal issues. CalIT2 also develops and deploys prototype infrastructure for testing new solutions in real-world environments.

CalIT2 has focused on four core enabling technologies of wireless telecommunications, photonics, nanotechnology/micro-electro-mechanicals systems (MEMS), and cyber space in order to digitally transform applications in culture, health, energy, and the environment. Partnering with companies such as Broadcom, Cisco Systems, Hitachi, and Google Earth, CalIT2 has collaborated with industry on sponsored research, technology licensing, and spinoffs based on CalIT2 inventions. The State of California initially provided a $100 million grant to CalIT2 to support the design and construction of campus buildings and facilities at its founding locations in La Jolla and Irvine. CalIT2 also receives support from funding agencies such as the National Science Foundation, National Institutes of Health, Caltrans, and the UC Discovery Program.

== Research ==
Former logo of the institute

CalIT2 research projects are often multidisciplinary and have included the following areas:

- Medical devices
- Cultural heritage
- Visualization
- Brain imaging
- Batteries
- Environment & civil infrastructure
- Intelligent transportation
- Interfaces & software
- Network infrastructure
- New media arts
- Policy & society

== Gallery QI ==
Gallery QI (formerly gallery@calit2), located on first floor of Atkinson Hall on the UC San Diego campus, is led by an interdisciplinary committee of UC San Diego faculty. The gallery has presented numerous exhibitions from artists around the world, including Jordan Crandall, Carlos Trilnick, Felipe Zuñiga, Nina Waisman, Ignacio Lopez, Adriene Jenik, Antoinette LaFarge, Robert Allen, Greg Niemeyer and Sabrina Raaf. Guest curators have included Christiane Paul and Steve Dietz.

The gallery has hosted talks by artists including Ann Hamilton, Jordan Crandall, Micha Cárdenas, Amy Sara Carroll, Sharon Daniel, Warren Sack and Rita Raley.

== People ==
CalIT2 is home to scientists, artists, engineers and entrepreneurs, with faculty members often sharing affiliations with other academic departments, including Engineering, Music and Medicine. Roughly 600 participating faculty collaborate on projects, research centers and "living laboratories" across the consortium.

Leadership is divided into four main groups: Directors, Divisional Councils, Governing Board, and the advisory board. Notable and distinguished members of the advisory board include:

- Anne Petersen, co-chair (Research Professor, University of Michigan, Center for Human Growth and Development, Founder and President, Global Philanthropy Alliance)
- Drew Senyei, M.D., co-chair (managing director, Enterprise Partners)
- Mark Anderson (Chief Executive Officer, Strategic News Service)
- Greg Brandeau (former CTO, Walt Disney Studios)
- Vint Cerf (Vice President and Chief Internet Evangelist, Google)
- Martha Dennis (Independent Board Member)
- Raouf Y. Halim (Chief Executive Officer, Mindspeed Technologies, Inc.)
- Linda A. Hill (Professor, Harvard Business School)
- Jessie J. Knight, Jr. (former Chairman, San Diego Gas & Electric)
- Roberto Padovani (former CTO, Qualcomm)
- Peter G. Preuss (Chair, UC San Diego Foundation Board of Trustees)
- Stanton Rowe (Corporate Vice President for Advanced Technology, Edwards Lifesciences)
- David Schramm (former Chief Executive Officer, Maxwell Technologies)
- Andrew Viterbi (President, The Viterbi Group, Professor Emeritus, University of California San Diego)
- Julie Meier Wright (Senior Fellow, U.S. Council on Competitiveness)

== Buildings ==
CalIT2 currently has two buildings, one at UC San Diego, and another at UC Irvine. The two CalIT2 facilities have capabilities such as clean rooms, MEMS labs, immersive virtual reality facilities, and a digital cinema theater. Another feature of these buildings is shared laboratory space that can be reassigned or rearranged as new projects emerge.

=== UC San Diego building ===
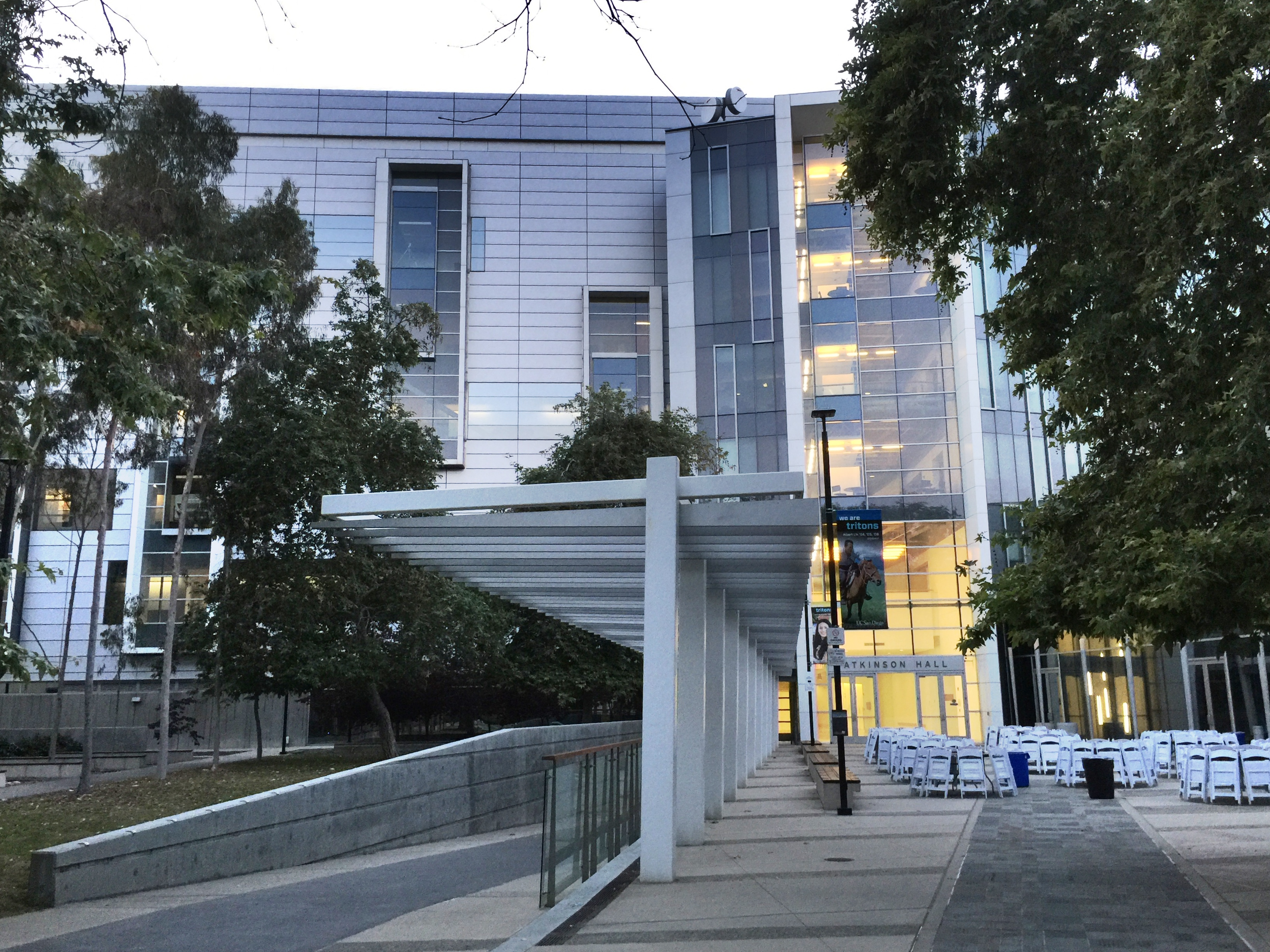
Atkinson Hall at UC San Diego

Atkinson Hall is the home of the Qualcomm Institute, CalIT2's San Diego division. The 215,000-square-foot facility was designed by NBBJ and constructed by Gilbane and is "inspired by the notion of change and the coexistence of opposites". This building was designed as an instrument of research to encourage partners to combine in unusual teams to make fundamental discoveries. Atkinson Hall's interior encourages open communication and collaboration between colleagues through its open and reconfigurable design. This building features the Qualcomm Institute Innovation Space, a start-up incubator; Gallery QI an arts exhibit space (see above); shared use facilities including the Nano3 cleanroom, prototyping lab, circuits lab, photonics lab and magnetoencephalography center; and event spaces from conference rooms to a high-tech auditorium that seats 200. Another feature Atkinson Hall provides to its visitors and researchers is its ample bandwidth, with about 2 million feet of category 6 copper cabling with 150 optical fibers connecting the building to UC San Diego's network.

=== UCI building ===
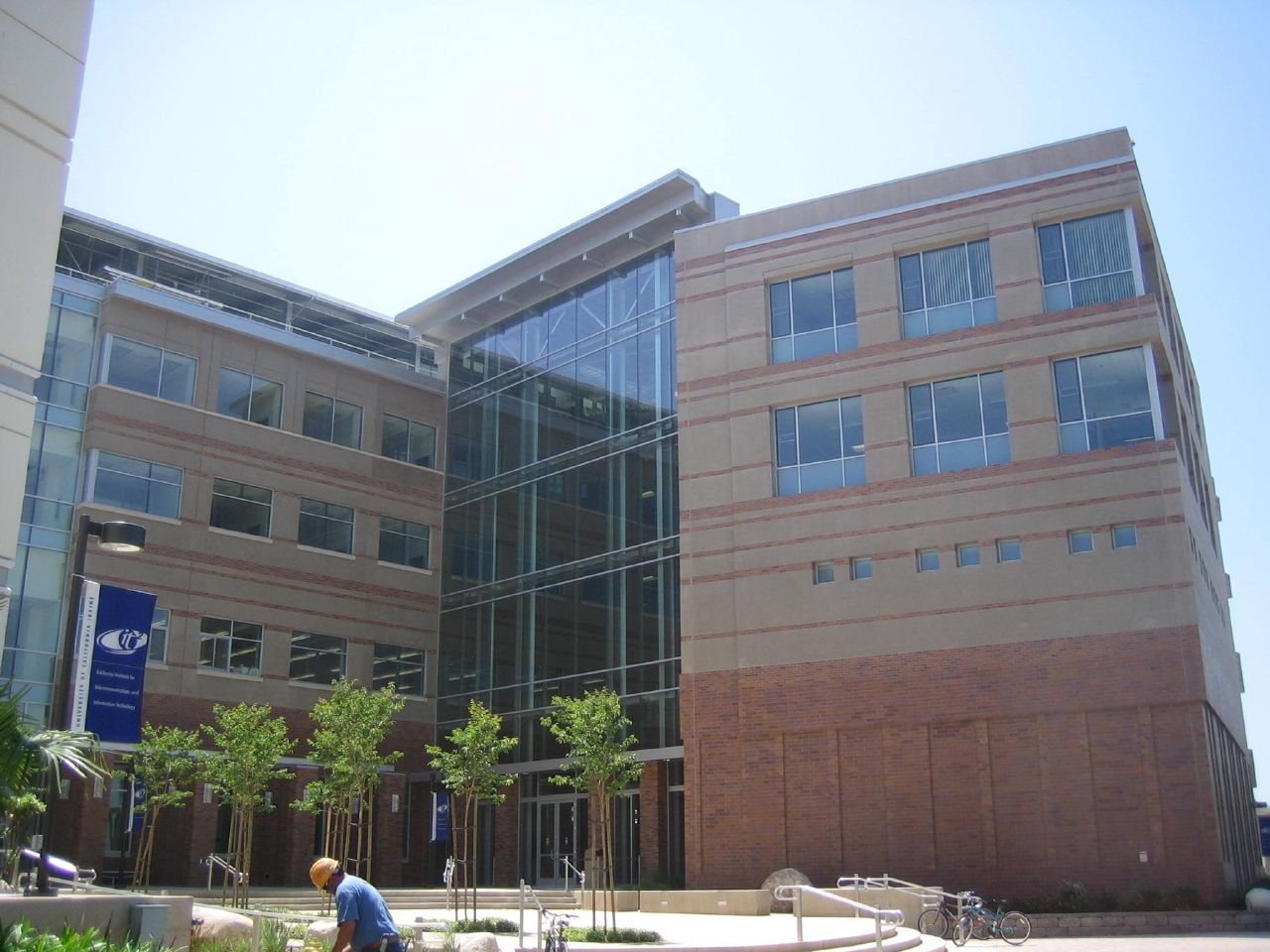
UCI Calit2 building

The CalIT2 building at the University of California, Irvine is a 120,000-square-foot building designed by Johnson Fain Partners and constructed by PCL Construction Services. Aside from its research labs, offices, support space, meeting space, and four-story atrium, the CalIT2 building at UCI also houses a 3,700 square-foot Nanofabrication Cleanroom Facility. This room offers a filtered-air environment, large-scale visualization lab, network lab, and also labs for optical devices, nanotechnology and media arts. The CalIT2 building features a spacious and state-of-the-art auditorium that can seat an audience of around 145 people. The UCI CalIT2 building is the home of TechPortal, a business technology incubator offering 1,460 square feet of space for up to eight companies. TechPortal provides affordable space, access to facilities/services, and expert mentoring to UCI-based startup companies. Also, with the help of the U.S. Geological Survey, this building also contains 40 seismic sensors that measure ground and building motion.

== Awards ==
CalIT2 is regularly awarded research grants by National Institutes of Health, National Science Foundation and other federal and state agencies. Along with research grants, CalIT2 has been honored the Innovations in Networking Award for High-Performance Research Applications by the Corporation for Education Network Initiatives in California (CENIC). This annual award is given out annually to "highlight exemplary innovations that leverage ultra high-bandwidth networking, particularly where those innovations have the potential to revolutionize the ways in which instruction and research are conducted, or where they further the deployment of broadband in underserved areas." A CalIT2 project honored by CENIC was its Mexican-American advanced network project to increase bandwidth and network communication between research facilities in Mexico and America. Other past projects recognized by CENIC have included the CineGrid consortium, the Scalable, Energy Efficient Datacenters (SEED) project, and the GreenLight project.

== See also ==
- MIT Media Lab - A similar entity on the East Coast
