= Guruswami Ravichandran =

- Born: 8 May 1959 (age 67); Kurichikottai, Tamil Nadu, India
- Citizenship: United States (Naturalized)
- Education: National Institute of Technology, Tiruchirappalli, BE; Brown University, MS, PhD
- Awards: Eringen Medal (2013); ASME Thurston Lecture Award (2018)
- Scientific career
- Fields: Mechanical engineering
- Workplaces: California Institute of Technology
- Thesis: Dynamic Fracture under Plane Wave Loading (1986)
- Doctoral advisor: Rodney Clifton
- Doctoral students: Samantha Daly

Guruswami Ravichandran (born 8 May 1959) is a professor of Aerospace and Mechanical Engineering at California Institute of Technology. He is also serving as the Otis Booth Leadership Chair of the Division of Engineering and Applied Science at Caltech. He served as the director of Guggenheim Aeronautical Laboratory (GALCIT) at California Institute of Technology from 2009 to 2015. He was named Fellow of the Society for Experimental Mechanics in 2010 and served as the president of the Society for Experimental Mechanics from 2015 to 2016.

He was elected a member of the National Academy of Engineering in 2015 for contributions to mechanics of dynamic deformation, damage, and failure of engineering materials. He received the 2018 American Society of Mechanical Engineers Robert Henry Thurston Lecture Award "for pioneering contributions to mechanics of materials, particularly dynamic deformation, damage and failure, micro/nano mechanics, wave propagation, composites, active materials, cell mechanics and experimental methods."

== Education ==
Guruswami Ravichandran received his Bachelor of Engineering (B.E.) in mechanical engineering from Regional Engineering College, Tiruchirappalli (now known as National Institute of Technology, Tiruchirappalli), formerly affiliated to University of Madras in 1981. He received Master of Science (M.S.) in Solid Mechanics and Structures in 1983, Applied Mathematics in 1984 and Doctorate of Philosophy (PhD) in Solid Mechanics and Structures in 1986, all from Brown University. National Institute of Technology, Tiruchirappalli awarded him Distinguished Alumnus Award in 2008.
