= T. V. Narendran =

Indian business executive (born 1965)

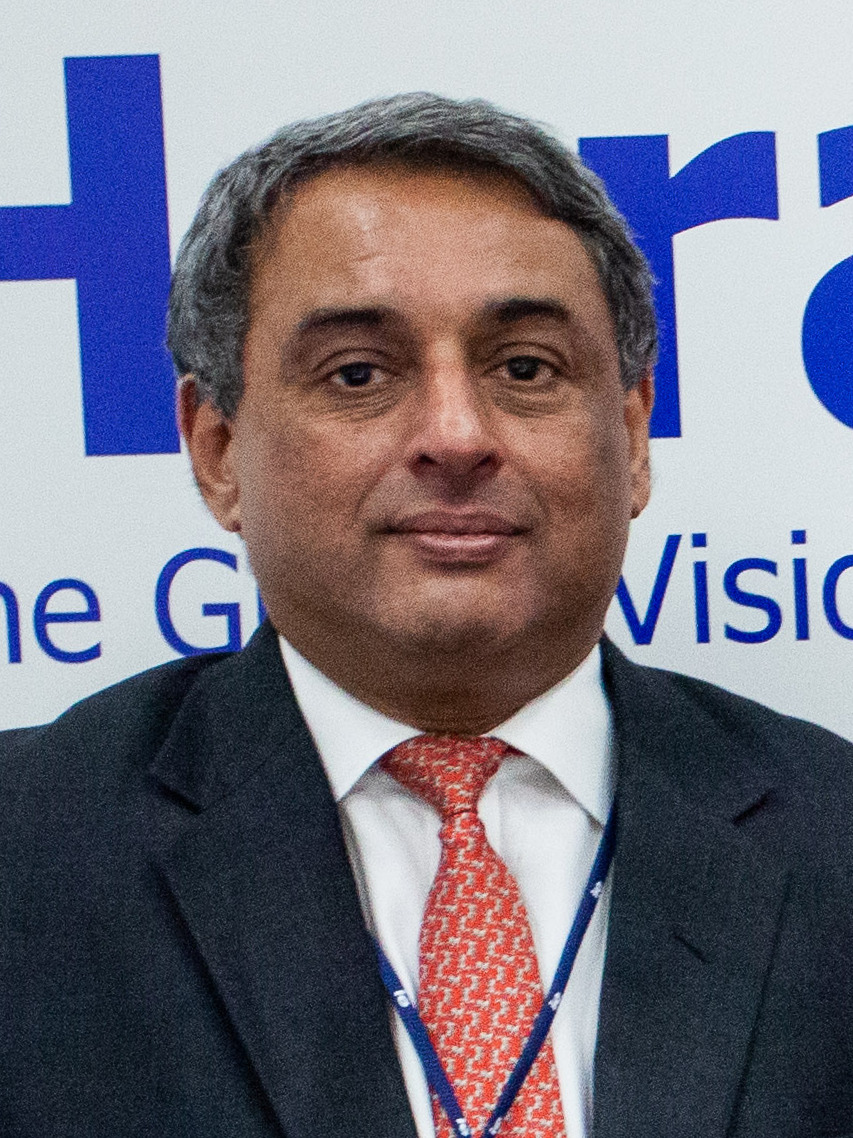
- Narendran in 2019
- Born: 2 June 1965 (age 61)
- Education: NIT Tiruchirappalli (Bachelor of Technology); IIM Calcutta (Master in Business Administration)
- Occupation: Business executive
- Employer: Tata Steel
- Known for: Global CEO & MD of Tata Steel; President of CII
- Spouse: Ruchi Narendran
- Children: 1
- Relatives: E. Ikkanda Warrier (Grandfather)

Thachat Viswanath Narendran (born 2 June 1965) is an Indian business executive. He is currently the global CEO and Managing Director of Tata Steel, one of the largest steel producers in the world.

He is also the President of Confederation of Indian Industry.

== Early life and education ==
T. V. Narendran was born in Tamil Nadu to a family with ancestral roots in Chendamangalam, Kerala. He is the grandson of E. Ikkanda Warrier, a freedom fighter and the first Prime Minister of the erstwhile Cochin State.

Narendran completed his undergraduate degree in mechanical engineering from the Regional Engineering College, Tiruchirappalli (now National Institute of Technology, Tiruchirappalli). He later earned a Master of Business Administration (MBA) from the Indian Institute of Management Calcutta.

== Career ==
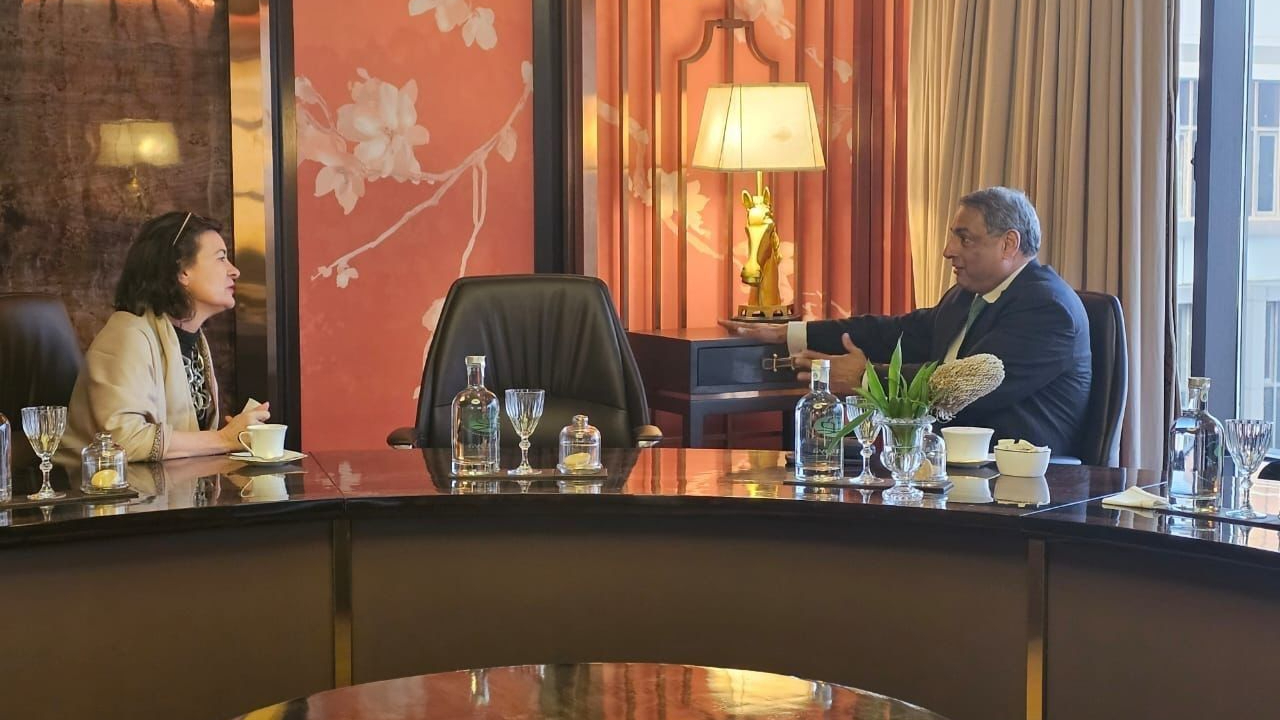
Narendran meeting Welsh health minister Eluned Morgan in 2024

Narendran joined Tata Steel in 1988 after completing his management degree from Indian Institute of Management Calcutta. He worked in the International Trading Division of Tata Steel from 1988 to 1997 wherein he spent five years in Dubai looking after Tata Steels' exports to the Middle East.

From 1997 to 2001, he spent time in Tata Steels' marketing and sales division and was involved in market development work for the Cold Rolling Mill Project, Supply Chain Management, Sales Planning, etc. From 2001 to 2003, he was the Chief of Marketing & Sales (Long Products) and played a key role in building the 'Tata Tiscon' brand and the distribution network for the same. From 2003 to 2005, he worked with B. Muthuraman, the then Managing Director of Tata Steel, as his Principal Executive Officer.

Before being appointed as MD - Tata Steel India and South East Asia, on 1 November 2013, Narendran was the Vice President - Safety & Flat Products Divisions of Tata Steel.

T. V. Narendran, CEO & Managing Director of Tata Steel Limited was the President of the Confederation of Indian Industry (CII) for the year 2021-22. In May 2022, He was succeeded by Sanjiv Bajaj as the President of CII.

On 31 October 2017, he was appointed as the global CEO and MD of Tata Steel.

== Board memberships ==
He is currently on the Boards of Tata Steel Limited, Tata Steel Europe, CEDEP, XLRI, IIT Patna and World Steel Association.
