= List of IIM Calcutta alumni =

This list of IIM Calcutta alumni includes notable people who are alumni of Indian Institute of Management Calcutta.

== Business ==
- Sunil Alagh, former MD and CEO of Britannia Industries
- Ajit Balakrishnan, founder and chief executive officer of Rediff.com; chairman of the board of governors of IIM Calcutta
- Vikrant Bhargava, co-founder and group marketing director, PartyGaming
- Rohit Chadda, CEO for the digital business at Zee group (Zee Entertainment, Zee Media and DNA); co-founder of foodpanda.com; Fortune 40 under 40
- Ashish Chauhan, managing director and CEO, Bombay Stock Exchange
- Pranay Chulet, co-founder and CEO of Quikr
- Sunil Duggal, chief executive officer of Dabur
- Sanjay Gupta, country manager of Google
- Sabyasachi Hajara, chairman and managing director, Shipping Corporation of India
- Patu Keswani, chairman and managing director of Lemon Tree Hotels
- Shantanu Khosla, MD of Procter & Gamble India
- M. R. Madhavan, president and co-founder of PRS Legislative Research
- P M Murty, former MD and CEO of Asian Paints
- Srinath Narasimhan, managing director and chief executive officer of Tata Teleservices
- T. V. Narendran, MD of Tata Steel
- Indra Nooyi, chairman and chief executive officer, PepsiCo
- Jessie Paul, author and marketer
- Sudhakar Ram, founder and CEO of Mastek
- Sumant Sinha, founder, chairman and CEO, ReNew Power
- Shyam Srinivasan, MD and CEO of Federal Bank
- Nishi Vasudeva, chairperson and managing director at Hindustan Petroleum; first woman to head a Navratna PSU
- Gopal Vittal, CEO of Bharti Airtel (India)

== Academics ==
- Prakash Apte, academic; professor and former director of Indian Institute of Management Bangalore
- B. B. Chakrabarti, former finance professor at IIM Calcutta; ex Director of Indian Institute of Management Ranchi (IIM Ranchi)
- Dipesh Chakrabarty, historian
- Ravi Dhar, George Rogers Clark Professor of Management and Marketing and Director of the Center for Customer Insights at the Yale School of Management
- Anindya Ghose, Heinz Riehl Chair professor and Director of the Masters in Business Analytics degree program at Stern School of Business at New York University
- Dan Gode, professor at New York University
- Ramachandra Guha, historian and author
- Gita Johar, vice dean for diversity, equity, and inclusion and Meyer Feldberg Professor of Business, Columbia Business School, Columbia University
- Ajay Kohli, Professor at Georgia Tech University
- Murali Mantrala, Professor at Kansas State University, Emeritus Professor, University of Missouri
- Krishna Palepu, professor at Harvard Business School, senior adviser to the president for Global Strategy, Harvard University
- Vallabh Sambamurthy, Dean of the Wisconsin School of Business, University of Wisconsin, Madison
- Chetan Sankar, Emeritus Professor of Raymond J. Harbert College of Business, Auburn University
- Mohanbir Sawhney, McCormick Tribune Professor of Technology, Kellogg School of Management
- Venkatesh Shankar, Coleman Chair Professor of Marketing and director of research at the Center for Retailing Studies at Mays Business School at Texas A&M University
- Paul Shrivastava, David O'Brien Distinguished Professor of Sustainable Enterprise, Concordia University
- M. J. Xavier, founding director of Indian Institute of Management Ranchi

== Literature ==
- Swati Kaushal, novelist
- Manreet Sodhi Someshwar, novelist
- Amish Tripathi, novelist, author of the Shiva Trilogy

== Government, politics, and social work ==
- Ajay Bisaria, Indian High Commissioner to Pakistan, former Ambassador to Poland and Lithuania
- Amolak Rattan Kohli, former Governor of Mizoram
- Vinayak Lohani, social entrepreneur, founder of Parivaar
- Dinesh K. Patnaik, Ambassador of India to the Kingdom of Spain and the Principality of Andorra, former Ambassador to Kingdom of Morocco and to the Kingdom of Cambodia; Deputy High Commissioner to the United Kingdom
- Krishnamurthy Subramanian, 17th Chief Economic Adviser to the Government of India

== Spirituality ==
- Swami Mukundananda, spiritual leader; bestselling author; founder of JKYog and Radha Krishna Temple, Dallas

== Other ==
- Malli Mastan Babu, mountaineer; known for his Guinness World Record for scaling the seven summits in 172 days in 2006
