= Hajara =

Hajara may refer to:

== People ==
=== First name ===
- Hajara Beebi Ismail (?-1994), Indian freedom fighter and social worker

=== Middle name ===
- Maria Hajara Braimoh (born 1990), Nigerian badminton player
- Prabhu Hajara Dusadh, Nepalese politician

=== Surname ===
- Sabyasachi Hajara (born 1952), Indian business executive
