= Ana Valenzuela =

- Occupations: Marketing scholar and academic
- Awards: National Merit Prize for Academic Excellence, Spanish Ministry of Education

Academic background
- Education: B.A., Business & Economics; M.B.A., International Business; Ph.D., Marketing
- Alma mater: University of Madrid; Georgetown University; University of California, Berkeley (postdoc)
- Website: https://www.ana-valenzuela.com/

Ana Valenzuela is a Marketing and Consumer Psychology professor and academic. She is Professor of Marketing at the Allen G. Aaronson Department of Marketing and International Business at City University of New York’s Baruch College, and Coordinator of the Marketing Specialization of the PhD Program in Business. She is also a Visiting Professor (Professor Titular) at the Department of Marketing of ESADE Business School at University Ramon Llull.

Valenzuela has conducted extensive research in the areas of consumer decision-making, cross-cultural differences in purchase behavior, in-store marketing, international marketing strategy.

== Education ==
In 1992, Valenzuela graduated in Business & Economics from University of Madrid. She then moved to Washington DC (US) for her MBA and received her degree specializing in International Business from Georgetown University in 1995. She moved back to Spain and earned her doctoral degree in Marketing from University of Madrid in 1998. In 2001, she completed her Postdoctoral fellowship at the University of California, Berkeley.

== Career ==
Following her Postdoctoral studies, Valenzuela taught at San Francisco State University from 2001 till 2005 before joining City University of New York as an Assistant Professor of Marketing at Baruch College. She was promoted to Associate Professor in 2009 and became a Full Professor of Marketing in 2016.

== Research ==
Valenzuela has worked on research questions connected to the following areas of knowledge: consumer-technology interactions, judgment and decision making, and cross-cultural consumer behavior.

=== Consumer-Technology Interactions ===
Valenzuela's latest stream of research deals with how technology impacts consumer decision-making. Her research in this area addresses two important questions: how the virtual display of options in customization interfaces affects trade-off saliency and the subjective difficulty of making a choice; and how the anthropomorphization of technological interfaces enhances product attachment and individual performance.

Valenzuela, together with Rhonda Hadi, demonstrated that haptic feedback accompanying message content can improve consumers’ task performance. This occurred because haptic feedback increases the sensation that the coach was actually present. Without this feedback, it felt like an impersonal technological exchange. In a related article, they demonstrated that the mere execution of an affectionate gesture (like a swipe) with an object can indeed enhance positive feelings towards it, but the effect is contingent on the presence of facilitating conditions, such as an anthropomorphic product design. Many companies already make humanization a determining factor of physical product design.

=== Judgment and decision making ===
In this research regarding this area of judgment and decision making, Valenzuela, together with Florian Zettlemeyer and Ravi Dhar, highlighted the influence of differences in self-customization processes on factors including satisfaction level regarding the customized option, level of difficulty in decision making, and the degree of willingness to purchase. She also conducted various studies regarding position biases in decision-making. She investigated the schemas connected with centrality of physical position and proposed different implications for both people and product-based decisions. Valenzuela examined the influence of differences in cultural orientation on the behavioral outcomes in an incomplete information bargaining situation.

In a different stream of research, Valenzuela, together with Priya Raghubir, studied the existence and implications of consumers' position-based beliefs regarding product layouts and focused on center-stage effect. She highlighted the theoretical implications for marketplace meta-cognitions, position effects, visual information processing, and the usage of memory-based individuating information for making judgments.

The last paper she published within this stream of research with Priya Raghubir develops the theory of position-based inferences further into a framework that includes beliefs based on both horizontal and vertical positions on shelf arrays. In particular, consumers are aware of the fact that top positions tend be associated with more expensive products than bottom positions but have not consistently confirmed their beliefs regarding horizontal positions. As a consequence, inferential processes in the horizontal orientation become less conscious and controllable than those in the vertical orientation.

=== Cross-cultural consumer behavior ===
Cultural identity represents a very important dimension of the decision maker´s identity. Valenzuela´s research focuses on judgment biases that arise from differences between Western and East Asian individuals in their modes of thought as well as their feelings and desires. Valenzuela conducted extensive research on topics connected with cross-cultural consumer behavior. In 2010, she, along with Barbara Mellers and Judi Strebel, published a paper on comparison between East Asian and Western consumers’ emotional reactions towards unexpected incentives.

Valenzuela's research on international marketing strategies focuses on identifying the elements of marketing programs, which lead to high performance and probability of involvement in foreign markets. Her study highlighted the importance of distribution network in designing export promotion policies. She published an article in 2001 explaining export regional involvement in context of marketing strategy. In her study, she highlighted the case of Spanish companies exporting to Latin America. Valenzuela also developed a model using seemingly unrelated regressions to estimate the explanatory value of the various elements of the marketing strategy, and company characteristics.

Finally, Valenzuela, together with Tulin Erdem, conducted a cross-country validation study to investigate the importance of information economics view of brand equity in context of consumer brand choice in countries having multiple cultural dimensions. Her study indicated a significant role of brands as signals of product positions. Her study also highlighted the effect of brand credibility on consumer's choice.

== Awards and honors ==
- 1993 - Prize for Academic Excellence, Price Waterhouse
- 1993 - National Merit Prize for Academic Excellence (Ranked 1st in the All Spain Business Examinations), Spanish Ministry of Education

== Bibliography ==
- Rhonda Hadi, Ana Valenzuela (2020) "Good Vibrations: Consumer Responses to Technology-Mediated Haptic Feedback," Journal of Consumer Research, 47 (2), 256–271.
- Hildebrand, Diogo, DeMotta, Yoshiko, Sen, Sankar and Valenzuela, Ana (2017) "Consumer Responses to Corporate Social Responsibility (CSR) Contribution Type." Journal of Consumer Research, 44(4), 738–758.
- Valenzuela, Ana and Raghubir, Priya (2015) "Are Top-Bottom Inferences Conscious and Left-Right Inferences Automatic? Implications for Shelf Space Positions," Journal of Experimental Psychology: Applied, 21(3), 224-241.
- Rhonda, Hadi and Valenzuela, Ana (2014) "A meaningful embrace: Contingent effects of embodied cues of affection," Journal of Consumer Psychology, 24(4), 520-532.
- Valenzuela, Ana, Mellers, Barbara and Strebel, Judy (2010) "Pleasurable Surprises: A Cross-Cultural Study of Consumer Responses to Unexpected Incentives," Journal of Consumer Research, 36(5), 792-805.
- Valenzuela, Ana, Dhar, Ravi and Zettlemeyer, Florian (2009) "Contingent Response to Self-Customization Procedures: Implications for Decision Satisfaction and Choice," Journal of Marketing Research, 46(6), 754-763.

Valenzuela, Ana and Raghubir Priya (2009) "Position-based Beliefs: The Center-Stage Effect," Journal of Consumer Psychology, 19(2), 185-196.

- Erdem, Tulin, Swait, Joffre and Valenzuela, Ana (2006) "Brands as Signals: A Cross-Country Validation Study," Journal of Marketing, 41(1), 86-100.
- Erdem, Tulin, Zhao, Ying and Valenzuela, Ana (2004) "Performance of Store Brands: A Cross-Country Analysis of Consumer Store Brand Preferences, Perceptions and Risk," Journal of Marketing Research, 41(1), 86-115.
