= Chandy =

Chandy is the Malayalam name meaning Alexander. Notable people with the given name or surname include:

- Anna Chandy (1905–1996), first woman Judge of India
- Arjun Chandy, Indo-American singer
- Jacob Chandy (1910–2007), Indian neurosurgeon and teacher
- K.M. Chandy (politician) (1921–1998), Indian politician
- K. Mani Chandy (born 1944), Indian-American computer scientist and professor
- K. T. Chandy (1913–2006), Indian education administrator and business executive
- Nomita Chandy (1946–2015), Indian social worker
- Oommen Chandy (1943-2023), nineteenth Chief Minister of Kerala, India
- Palliveettil Chandy (latinized Alexander de Campo; 1615–1687), Indian bishop of Saint Thomas Christians
- Rajesh Chandy, American entrepreneur
- Thomas Chandy (1947–2019), former transport minister of Kerala, India

== See also ==
- Chandi (disambiguation)
- Chandyr River, a tributary of the Atrek River in Turkmenistan
