= Jessie Paul =

Indian businessman

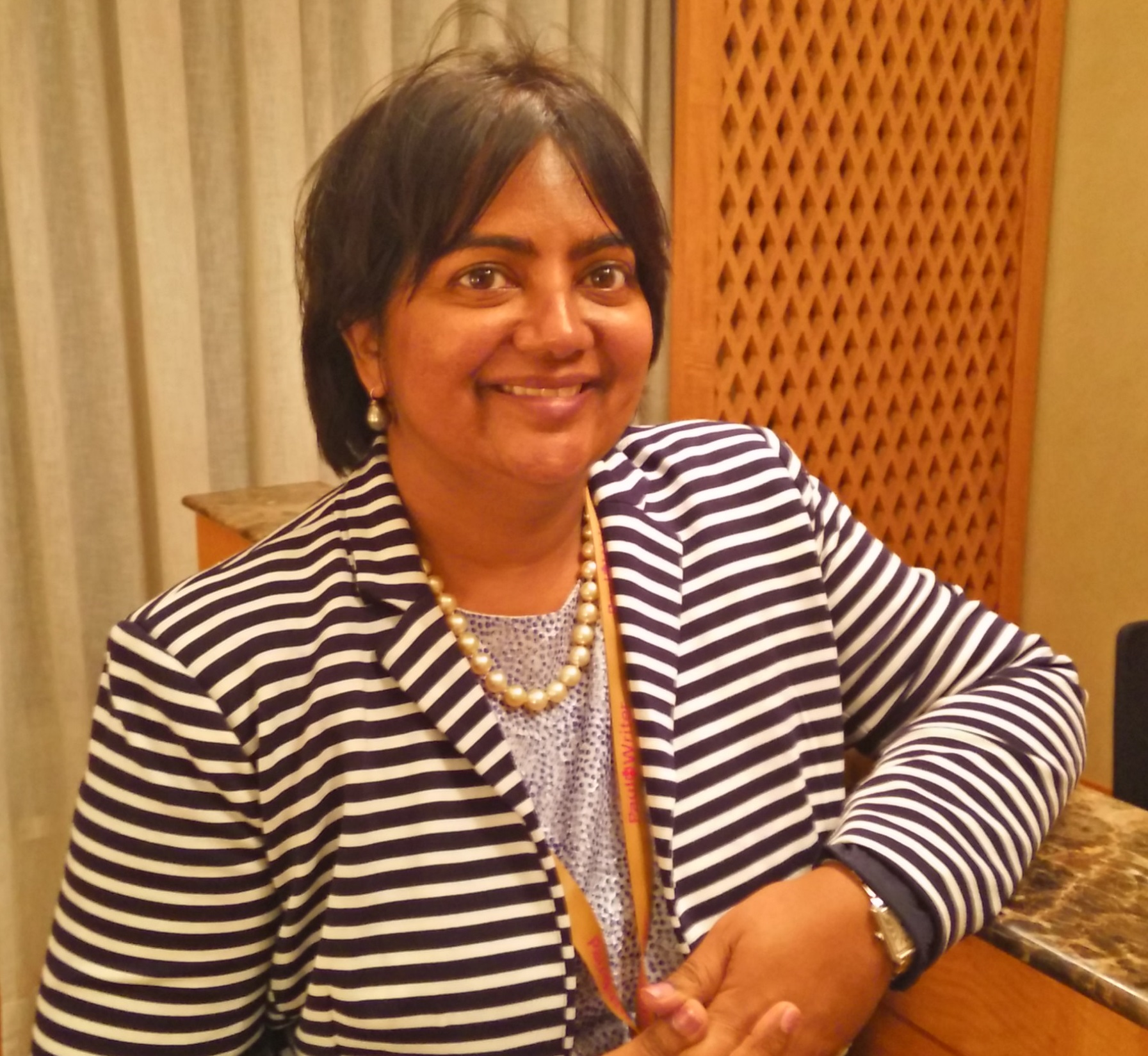
- Education: IIM Calcutta
- Occupations: Writer, marketer, CEO, marketing consultant
- Known for: Author of No Money Marketing, former CMO of Wipro
- Children: 1

Jessie Paul is an Indian marketer, founder and CEO of a marketing advisory firm, public speaker, and author. She was chief marketing officer of Wipro IT Business and global brand manager at Infosys.

Paul is a non-executive director with SQS India BFSI Limited, Expleo Solutions, Bajaj Consumer Care, Royal Orchid Hotels, CreditAccess Grameen.

== Education and personal life ==
She started her education at a convent in Delhi, did 2nd to 5th grade in Sydney, Australia, and completed her schooling from an all girls school in her native village of Nazareth, Tamil Nadu.

Paul holds a bachelor's degree in computer science and an engineering degree from National Institute of Technology, Tiruchirappalli and an MBA in marketing from Indian Institute of Management Calcutta.

Paul is married, with one daughter, and resides in Bengaluru, India.

== Career ==
After graduating from NIT, she joined the technology design firm, Tata Elxsi, as a trainer and part of the sales support team.

Paul had worked for almost 15 years in companies including O&M, Infosys and iGate. In 1998, Paul worked at Infosys as a Global Brand Manager. Her role included heading the set up of the company's marketing team and field marketing programs like the Wharton Infosys Business Transformation Award, which she anchored. During her time, Infosys also received the US-based IT Services Marketing Association’s Diamond Award. She was also part of the team which was involved in the NASDAQ listing of Infosys’ American Depositary Shares in 1999.

Paul left Infosys to join a start-up back-office firm Quintant Corporation in 2003 as its Global Marketing Head. Quintant was soon after acquired by iGate Corp where she then worked for two years.

In 2005, Paul became chief marketing officer and led a team of 50 at Wipro.

Paul quit Wipro Technologies in 2009 to start her own venture, Paul Writer Strategic Advisory. Paul has been named one of the most influential women in information technology in India.

== Publications ==
- Marketing Booster Magazine- India's first ever marketing magazine
- "What Motivates You?" - A book review of Payoff by Dan Ariely in Outlook Business
- No Money Marketing- a guide for marketing on low budget

== Honours and awards ==
- Chairman's Award, Infosys, 1998
- DataQuest's list of most powerful women in IT in India, 2005
- IT People's Award for Women in Leadership, 2008
- Featured in “Building a Global Brand - the Case Study of Wipro” authored by Prof Bharath Rao of Polytechnic University, NY, USA.
- Featured in Wipro Building a Global B2B Brand by Amitava Chattopadhyay of INSEAD, 2009.
