= Sophie Lou Jacobsen =

Sophie Lou Jacobsen is a French-American housewares, furniture, and industrial designer. Jacobsen is known for her colorful glass and bendy vases carafes, stemware, and lamps. Her style is influenced by fazzoletto (“handkerchief”) in which the finished glass product almost looks like draped fabric, a technique created in second-century Rome and reawakened in the 1940s by Italian glass masters Fulvio Bianconi and Paolo Veniniin.

== Work ==
Jacobsen has designed numerous signature houseware objects, both functional and decorative, including handblown glass cleaning bottles and totem glasses, sand-cast aluminum spiral coasters and eclectic martini glasses with colored, wobbly stems or stems and bouquets. She collaborates often with the glassblower, Adam Holtzinger.

The designer opened her studio in 2019. Jacobsen collaborated with de Gournay for Tulipa, a suite of pendant lights, candle sconces, mirrors, plus vases inspired by chinoiserie wallpapers and it was exhibited at the London Design Festival.
