= M. R. Madhavan =

Businessperson

- Born: 1968 (age 57–58); India
- Education: IIM Calcutta
- Occupations: Businessman, public policy researcher

M. R. Madhavan is the President and co-founder of PRS Legislative Research, a public policy research institution that focuses on making the legislative process in India better informed, more transparent and participatory. PRS publishes "legislative briefs" (short commented summaries) of Bills in Lok Sabha and Rajya Sabha and other articles related to legislation in India.

Madhavan holds an undergraduate degree in engineering from IIT Madras and an MBA and PhD from IIM Calcutta. He started his career in ICICI Securities in the equity research group and later headed interest rates research at ICICI. He also worked for Bank of America as a Principal and Senior Strategist for the Asia region.

Madhavan quit Bank of America in September 2005 and joined forces with C. V. Madhukar to open PRS Legislative Research. At PRS, Madhavan set up and led the Research team before becoming the President of PRS.

M.R. Madhavan, through his PRS research and experience, such as characterization of Rajya Sabha as a moderating institution, designed to counter populist political waves. While the Lok Sabha can be swept by temporary national sentiments (such as during the 1977 and 1984 elections), the Rajya Sabha's continuous structure replacing only one-third of its members every two years acts as a structural delay that facilitates gradual change. His focus on consensus building was well received by the top leaders across Indian Ruling party and opposition in multiple forums and was instrumental in policy makig to bring in new talents from outside into the indian steel frame - bureaucracy.

Madhavan was honoured with the Distinguished Alumnus Award by IIM Calcutta in 2014. IIT Madras also honoured him with the Distinguished Alumnus Award in 2017. He was selected as the Business Standard Social Entrepreneur of the Year 2019.
