= Ajay Bisaria =

Indian diplomat

His Excellency Ajay Bisaria
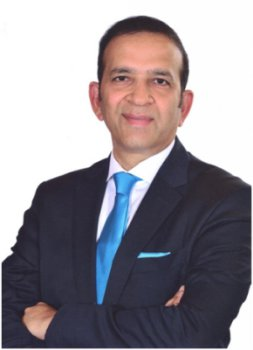

High Commissioner of India to Canada
- In office 3 March 2020 – June 2022
- President: Ramnath Kovind
- Preceded by: Vikas Swarup
- Succeeded by: Sanjay Kumar Verma

High Commissioner of India to Pakistan
- In office 12 December 2017 – 12 February 2020
- President: Ramnath Kovind
- Preceded by: Gautam Bambawale
- Succeeded by: Vacant

Ambassador of India to Poland
- In office 1 January 2015 – 1 November 2017
- President: Pranab Mukherjee
- Preceded by: Monika Kapil Mohta

Ambassador of India to Lithuania
- In office 1 January 2015 – 1 November 2017
- President: Pranab Mukherjee
- Preceded by: Monika Kapil Mohta

Personal details
- Born: Srinagar, Jammu & Kashmir, India
- Spouse: Bharati Chaturvedi
- Education: St. Stephen's College, Delhi (BA); Indian Institute of Management, Calcutta (MBA); Princeton University School of Public and International Affairs (MPP)
- Profession: Diplomat
- Website: https://ajaybisaria.in/

Ajay Bisaria is a corporate strategic advisor, guiding global businesses on geopolitics and regulations. He advises OMERS in India and several companies in private equity, fintech, health tech, and more. He is also a Distinguished Fellow at the Observer Research Foundation (ORF). Earlier Ajay Bisaria was an Indian diplomat with a diplomatic career spanning 35 years, Bisaria has held key positions in some of India's most critical economic and security relationships. He served as the High Commissioner of India to Canada from March 2020 to June 2022, and prior to that, he was the High Commissioner of India to Pakistan from December 2017 to February 2020. Bisaria has also represented India at the World Bank in Washington, D.C., and served in various capacities in Indian embassies in Berlin and Moscow. Within the Ministry of External Affairs, the Department of Commerce, and the Prime Minister’s Office, he played a significant role, including being a key aide to Prime Minister Atal Bihari Vajpayee from 1999 to 2004. Bisaria is a specialist in India's Eurasia policy, having worked extensively with Russia, Ukraine, and Central Asia. Before his diplomatic service, he worked with American Express Bank and Bharat Heavy Electricals Limited in Delhi.

== Education ==
He received his early education in Mumbai and New Delhi. He has a bachelor's degree in economics from the St. Stephens College, Delhi University (1980–83), a master's degree in Business Administration from the Indian Institute of Management, Calcutta (1983–85) and a master's degree in Public Policy from Princeton University (2008 – 09).

== Career ==
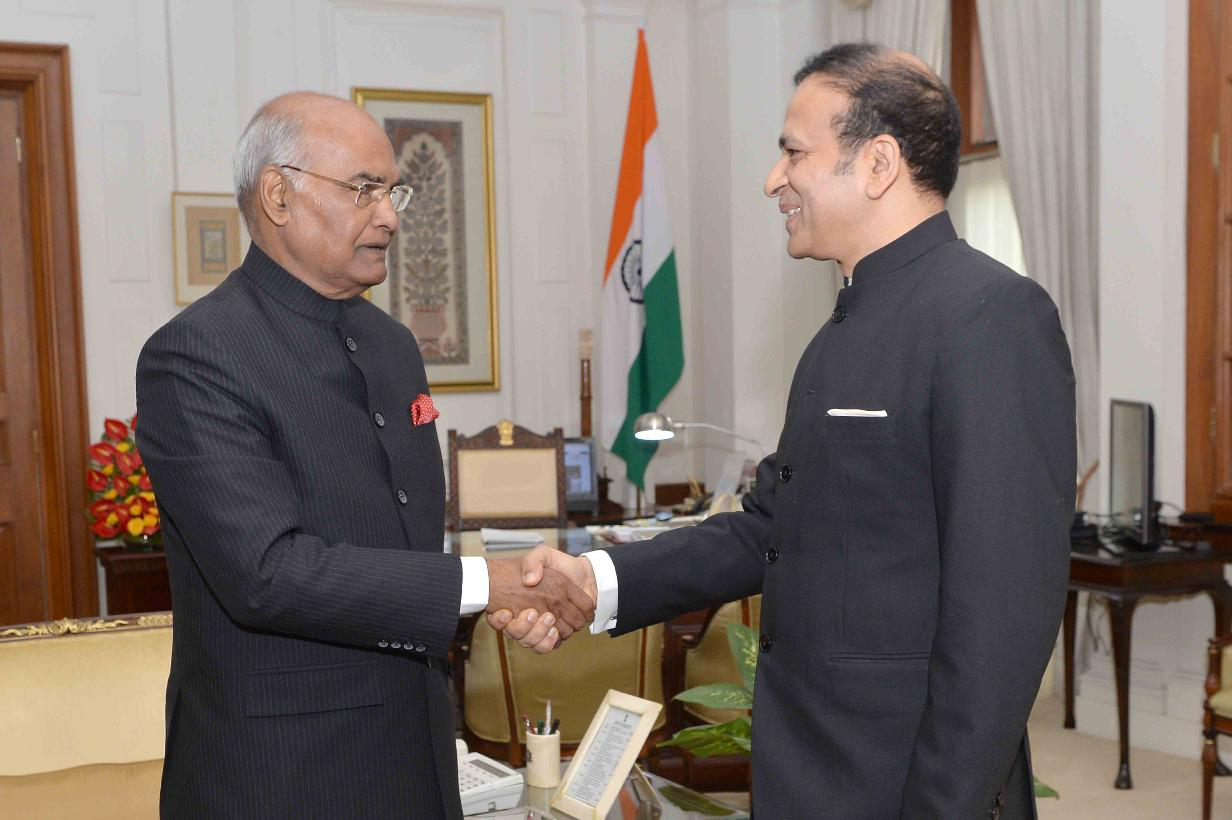
Ajay Bisaria meeting with the President of India, Ram Nath Kovind, at Rashtrapati Bhavan on 4 December 2017

After training at the Foreign Service Institute in New Delhi, Ajay Bisaria chose Russian as his language of specialization and was posted at the Indian Embassy in Moscow (1988 – 1991) where he was attached to the economic and political wings of the Embassy. He worked as a Soviet internal affairs specialist in the months leading up to the dissolution of the USSR.

He served as Under Secretary in the Ministry of External Affairs on the East Europe desk (1991 – 92) when India was engaged in building new relationships with the post-Soviet countries. He then moved to the Ministry of Commerce (1992–95), in the era of economic liberalization. He contributed to a new trade policy paradigm, using his training in economics and finance, as part of a team that managed a complex transition of India's trade arrangements from a rupee-based to a hard currency regime.

He was posted as First Secretary in the Indian Embassy in Berlin (1995–1999), where he facilitated commercial relations at a time of rising economic engagement between a unifying Germany and a liberalizing India. He also led a project management team to oversee the development and construction of the new building of the Embassy of Indian in Berlin in the historic Tiergarten area.

In 1999, Bisaria was appointed Private Secretary to the Prime Minister of India, Atal Bihari Vajpayee, and served in the role for the whole of Vajpayee's term, until 2004. In addition to managing the office of the Prime Minister as staff officer, he acted as an advisor to Vajpayee on various economic, defence and foreign policy initiatives. He attended more than 50 international summits with the Prime Minister as part of his delegation.

Following his service at the Prime Minister's Office, Bisaria was seconded to the World Bank in Washington D.C. as an Advisor to the executive director for South Asia (2004–2008), where he worked on development projects and aid issues, contributing to corporate governance and India's multilateral economic diplomacy. He was involved in developing a policy approach to enhance India's rankings in reports on the Ease of Doing Business.

In 2009, Bisaria returned to Delhi to serve as Joint Secretary (Eurasia) in the Ministry of External Affairs (2009–2014). In this role, he coordinated India's foreign policy and bilateral relations with the Eurasia region (including Russia, Ukraine and Central Asia). He was the principal architect behind the United Progressive Alliance government's new policy outlook for India in Central Asia (‘Connect Central Asia’) and coordinated India's approach to six annual Indo-Russian summits, including the first annual summit between Prime Minister Modi and President Putin in India in December 2014. Additionally, he led the development of the India-Russia ‘special and privileged strategic partnership’. He also worked on India's relationship with multilateral institutions like the Shanghai Cooperation Organisation, including managing India's application to join the group, and led India's participation in the Russia–India–China trilateral dialogue.

In January 2015, Bisaria was appointed India's Ambassador to Poland, based in Warsaw, with concurrent accreditation to Lithuania, serving until November 2017. During his time in Poland, he focused on forging economic partnerships and deepening India's cultural footprint in Central and Eastern Europe. He also served as India's representative in the Warsaw-based Community of Democracies, participating in the Community meetings in Warsaw, Geneva and New York.

== As High Commissioner to Pakistan ==
From December 2017 to February 2020, Bisaria served as India's High Commissioner to Pakistan. During his tenure, Pakistan and India experienced a decline in bilateral relations – arising from increased violence and terrorism emanating from Pakistan, particularly in the contested region of Kashmir. He was in Pakistan at the time of a terrorist attack by the Pakistan-based Jaish-e-Muhammad in Pulwama, which culminated in the Balakot airstrike, the first instance of aerial combat between Indian and Pakistani air forces since the Bangladesh Liberation War in 1971. Prior to these events, however, Bisaria helped India establish a relationship with the newly elected Tehreek-i-Insaf Government of Prime Minister Imran Khan. He also worked on efforts to expand Indian nationals' access to the Kartarpur Corridor. He returned to India in August 2019, when Pakistan downgraded its bilateral relationship with India. He retained the designation of High Commissioner of India to Pakistan based in India, till February 2020.

In the Indian Civil Service, Bisaria held the rank of Secretary to the Government of India. He was part of the team representing India at the United Nations Human Rights Council, Geneva in September 2019, to promote India's record on human rights.

== As High Commissioner to Canada ==
In March 2020, Bisaria was appointed High Commissioner to Canada. Bisaria's tenure began during the COVID-19 pandemic and involved facilitating the repatriation of Indian nationals under the Vande Bharat scheme ‘air bubble’. He received a shipment of Indian vaccines sent to Canada in March 2021, along with then Minister for Procurement of Canada, Anita Anand. This gesture under India's Vaccine Maitri program, created greater trust and friendship in India's strategic ties with Canada. Through his tenure, Bisaria worked on the India-Canada economic corridor, stating publicly that the economic partnership should drive the political relationship. He has advocated stronger economic ties ‘between the two Indo-Pacific democracies and G-20 economies’. He is credited with developing strong connections with CEO's and leaders of Canadian pension funds and investment firms, which have ratcheted up investments to over US$60 billion in India, particularly in the infrastructure sector. In this period, several major Canadian firms also stepped up FDI in India. He has pushed for an India-Canada early progress trade agreement which may be finalised in 2022.
