= Vikram Goyal =

Indian Product Designer

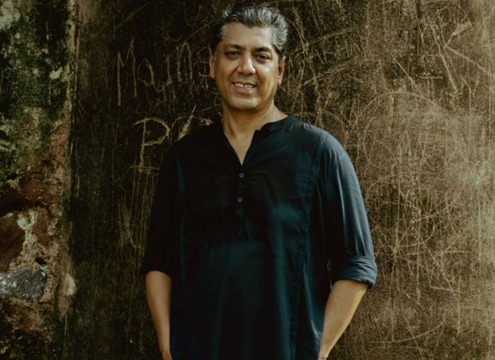
- Born: New Delhi, India
- Citizenship: Indian
- Education: BITS Pilani (B.Eng.); Princeton University (M.E.)
- Occupations: Product designer and entrepreneur
- Website: Official website

Vikram Goyal is an Indian product designer and artist whose work includes immersive installations and brass sculptures. He founded Viya and Vikram Goyal Studio.

Goyal works primarily with brass to create large-scale furniture and architectural pieces, including wall panels, screens, chandeliers, and consoles. His practice often employs repoussé and other traditional metalworking techniques, drawing on historical motifs and emphasizing scale and depth. He was the curator of The Great Elephant Migration, an international travelling exhibition comprising 100 elephant sculptures.

== Early life and education ==
Goyal was born and raised in New Delhi. He earned a Bachelor's degree in Engineering from BITS Pilani and later completed a Master's degree in Development Economics from Princeton University.

== Career ==
Goyal began his professional career in finance at Morgan Stanley, working in New York and later in Hong Kong. In 2000, he returned to India and co-founded Kama Ayurveda, a skincare and wellness brand.

In 2003, Goyal founded Viya Home, a design studio focused on furniture and decorative objects drawing on Indian craft traditions. He later established Vikram Goyal Studio, where a team of artisans produces metalwork for furniture and interior projects. Viya (formerly Viya Home) has expanded into the production of everyday objects.

Goyal’s work has been presented at design fairs and exhibitions in India and abroad. In 2018, his pieces were included in The Sculpture Park at Madhavendra Palace, Nahargarh Fort, Jaipur. The following year, he participated in the 15 Years Retrospective exhibition at Bikaner House, New Delhi. He debuted at the India Art Fair in 2023 and returned in 2024, presenting works such as Silken Passage, a 28-foot brass mural referencing the Silk Route.

In 2023, he collaborated with the Italian design gallery Nilufar to present his work at Salone del Mobile in Milan and PAD London, maintaining this association in 2024. In December 2024, he partnered with British décor brand de Gournay to create a collection of hand-painted wallpapers, which premiered in India on 23 November 2024. It was followed by a showcase at Design Miami on 4 December 2024, in collaboration with The Future Perfect.

In June 2025, Goyal presented his first exhibition in Kolkata at Burdwan Palace. The exhibition, held in association with 85 Lansdowne, brought together works from Vikram Goyal Studio and Viya in a joint display for the first time.

The following month, he curated Wrapped in History, the final artistic chapter of The Great Elephant Migration. The project involved one hundred life-sized elephant sculptures draped in ceremonial blankets created by fifty-five artists, fashion houses, and Indigenous communities, including Ralph Lauren, Elie Saab, Sabyasachi, Ritu Kumar, and Masaba Gupta. Contributions also came from Indian artisan groups such as Pipli embroidery makers, tie-dye specialists, and Rabari women artisans. The blankets were later auctioned to raise funds for conservation through the charity Elephant Family.

In October 2025, Goyal collaborated with Norwegian-born olfactory artist Sissel Tolaas to create The Soul Garden, a sensory art installation presented by The Future Perfect at Design Miami Paris. The exhibition was held at L’Hôtel de Maisons, formerly the Parisian residence of Karl Lagerfeld.

== Personal life ==
Goyal resides in South Delhi, where his home was designed in collaboration with architect Abhimanyu Dalal.

== Recognition ==
- Listed in Architectural Digest’s ranking of 100 architects and interior designers in India.
- EDIDA Designer of the Year winner in 2009, 2016 and 2024.

== Published work ==
- Shringara of Shrinathji. Mapin Publishing. 2021. ISBN 978-9385360862.
