= Nishii =

Nishii (written: 西井 or 西飯) is a Japanese surname. Notable people with the surname include:

- Kazuo Nishii (西井 一夫, 1946–2001), Japanese magazine editor and photography critic
- Tokuyasu Nishii (西飯 徳康), Japanese table tennis player

== See also ==
- Nishi (disambiguation)
