= Srinath Narasimhan =

Indian business executive (born 1962)

- Born: 8 July 1962 (age 64)
- Citizenship: India
- Education: IIM Calcutta; IIT Madras
- Occupations: MD & CEO of Tata Teleservices

Srinath Narasimhan (born 8 July 1962) is an Indian business executive. He was the CEO of Tata Trusts and former managing director and chief executive officer of Tata Teleservices, an Indian broadband and telecommunications service provider and part of the business conglomerate Tata Group. Narasimhan joined the Tata Group in 1986, and has also been the CEO of two other group companies, Tata Communications and Tata Internet Services. During his stint & acquisitions of Tyco & Teleglobe for Tata Communications Srinath made them the largest network carrier globally, originating from the Indian subcontinent.

Narasimhan holds a degree in mechanical engineering from Indian Institute of Technology Madras and an MBA from Indian Institute of Management Calcutta.
