= Sudhakar Ram =

Indian businessman (1960-2020)

- Born: 8 September 1960 (age 65); Chennai, Tamil Nadu, India
- Died: 8 November 2020 (aged 60)
- Education: Loyola College, Chennai; IIM Calcutta
- Occupations: Group CEO and Managing Director, Mastek
- Spouse: Girija Ram
- Children: 1

Sudhakar Ram (8 September 1960 – 8 November 2020), was the Group CEO and Managing Director of Mastek, a software company. He was awarded CNBC Asia's ‘India Business Leader of the Year’ in 2007. He is the lead contributor to the blog - The New Constructs. Sudhakar Ram recently published "The Connected Age", a book based on the world's dystopian environment.

== Early life and education ==
Sudhakar Ram was born on 8 September 1960 in Chennai. His early childhood and schooling was in Delhi and Kolkata. When he was eight, his family moved to Chennai. Sudhakar Ram graduated in Commerce from Loyola College, Chennai and completed his MBA from IIM Calcutta. He was the silver medalist at IIM-C. At IIM-C, he developed a keen interest in computers.

== Career ==
Prior to joining Mastek, he served as the Chief Information Officer of Rediffusion Dentsu Young & Rubicam. Sudhakar Ram, along with three graduates from Indian Institute of Management Ahmedabad (IIM-A), Ashank Desai, Ketan Mehta and R. Sundar, started Mastek in May 1982.

== Personal life ==
Sudhakar met his wife Girija while pursuing his MBA at IIM Calcutta. He has a daughter named Samvitha.

== Awards and recognition ==
- 2007: CNBC Asia's India Business Leader of the year.
