= Manreet Sodhi Someshwar =

Indian author

- Born: Punjab, India
- Education: IIM Calcutta
- Occupation: Novelist
- Spouse: Prasanna Someshwar
- Children: Malvika Someshwar
- Writing career
- Genre: Fiction
- Website: manreetsodhisomeshwar.com

Manreet Sodhi Someshwar is an Indian author. She is primarily known for her novels The Long Walk Home and The Taj Conspiracy.

Someshwar is an alumnus of Indian Institute of Management Calcutta. After graduating from IIM-C, she worked in Hindustan Unilever where she was an area sales manager for Gujarat and Maharashtra. She later worked in other companies in marketing and advertising before starting her writing career.

Someshwar's first novel, Earning the Laundry Stripes, was released in 2006. Her second book, The Long Walk Home was published in 2009 by HarperCollins India. The Taj Conspiracy, a thriller, is her third novel and was released in 2012.

== Works ==
=== Novels ===
- Earning the Laundry Stripes (2006)
- The Long Walk Home (2009)
- The Taj Conspiracy (2012)
- The Hunt for Kohinoor (2013)
- The Peacock Throne Prophecy is a work-in-progress
- The Radiance of a Thousand Suns (2019)
