= Sabyasachi =

Sabyasachi is a masculine Indian given name. Notable people with the name include:

- Kazi Sabyasachi, Indian Bengali elocutionist.
- Sabyasachi Chakrabarty, Indian Bengali actor.
- Sabyasachi Hajara, Indian business executive.
- Sabyasachi Mishra, Indian Odia actor.
- Sabyasachi Mohapatra, Indian Odia actor, director.
- Sabyasachi Mukherjee, Indian fashion designer.
- Sabyasachi Sarkar, Indian chemist.
- Sabyasachi Mukharji, was an Indian jurist, who was the twentieth Chief Justice of India

== See also ==
- Sabyasachi (1977 film)
