= Nishi =

Nishi may refer to:

== People ==
- Nishi (surname)
- Nishi Vasudeva (born 1956), Indian business executive
- Nishi (actress), Indian actress Nishi Kohli
- Nishi (tribe), in Arunachal Pradesh, India
  - Nishi language, their Sino-Tibetan language

== Other uses ==
- Nishi District, Hokkaidō, Japan
- Nishi language, a Sino-Tibetan language of India
- Nishi Daak, a cruel ghost; see Ghosts in Bengali culture

== See also ==
- Nishi-ku (disambiguation), various wards in Japanese cities
- Nishi–Rosen Agreement, an 1898 Russo–Japanese agreement over disputed territory in Korea
