= Vinayak Lohani =

Indian social entrepreneur

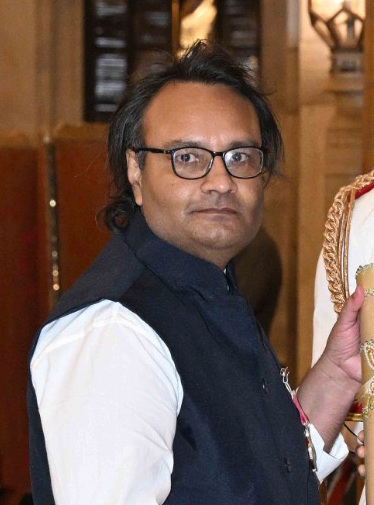
- Lohani receiving the Padma Shri in 2025
- Born: 12 April 1978 (age 48); Bhopal, Madhya Pradesh
- Citizenship: India
- Education: B.Tech, MBA
- Alma mater: IIT Kharagpur, IIM Calcutta
- Known for: Founder of Parivaar, Social Entrepreneur
- Awards: Padma Shri (2025)

Vinayak Lohani is the founder of Parivaar, a humanitarian institution with its chief institutions and field areas in based in West Bengal, Madhya Pradesh, Jharkhand and Chhattisgarh. Lohani was influenced by the teachings of Ramakrishna and Swami Vivekananda, particularly Vivekananda's concept of serving the "Divine in Man.

In January 2025, he was honored with the Padma Shri, India's fourth-highest civilian award, by the Government of India.

== Early life and education ==
Vinayak Lohani was born in Bhopal, Madhya Pradesh and did his schooling there. His family roots are from Almora district of Kumaon region in Uttarakhand. He went to IIT Kharagpur to do his B.Tech and thereafter worked for Infosys for a year. In 2001, he joined IIM Calcutta to do his MBA.

== Career ==
At IIM Calcutta, Vinayak opted out of the placement process. After completing the MBA course, with just 3 children in a small rented building and almost no financial resources, he started Parivaar for children from impoverished and destitute backgrounds in late 2003. At the end of 2004, Parivaar purchased its own land and developed its first campus: Parivaar Ashram. In 2011, Parivaar expanded to having separate campuses for boys and girls. As of December 2023, there are more than 1900 resident children (girls and boys) at Parivaar, making it the largest and high-quality residential program for children from impoverished strata in West Bengal.

In 2016–17, Parivaar also started working in Madhya Pradesh. It has started 832 Nutritional Meals cum Education centers for children in selected impoverished tribal and rural pockets called 'Sri Ramakrishna Vivekananda Seva Kutir' in 18 districts serving more than 40,000 children. Parivaar also runs 2 residential schools and 2 hostels in the districts of Dewas, Sehore and Mandla of Madhya Pradesh. More than 1100 boys and girls from different tribal geographies of the state are residing in these campuses. Apart from these, Parivaar also runs 93 free 24*7 ambulances across 23 districts and 21 mobile medical clinics in 8 districts covering 982 villages in Madhya Pradesh, under which more than 15 lac patients have been served till December 2024. Under its Vision Restoration Program, Parivaar has organized more than 5700 camps in 42 months in collaboration with several eye hospitals under which more than 6.48 lac patients have been served and 72 thousand free eye surgeries have been performed.

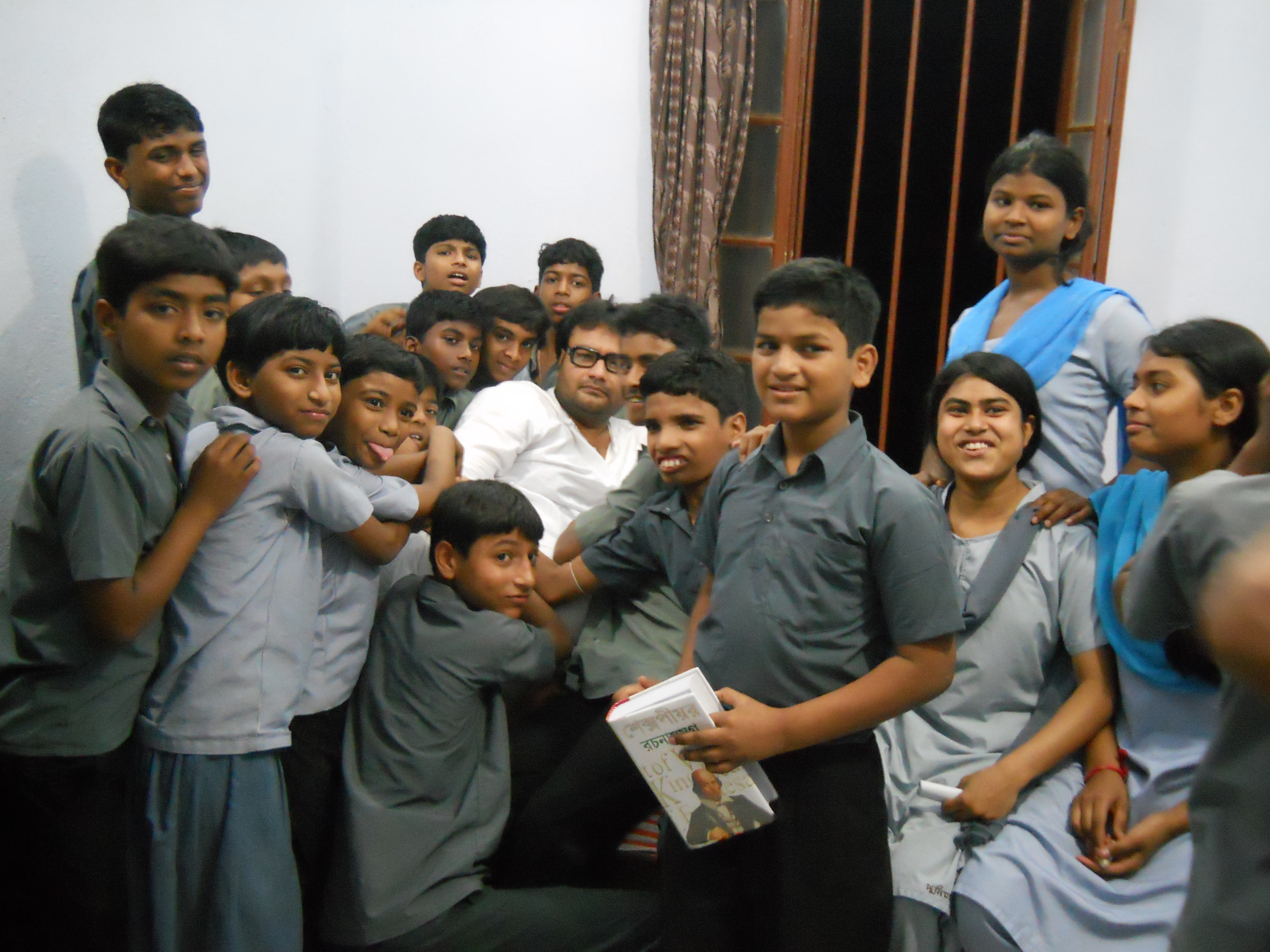
Vinayak with children at Parivaar

== Awards and honors ==
- 2025: Padma Shri from the Government of India.
- 2022: The First 'Madhya Pradesh Gaurav Samman' in the category of Health and Nutrition was presented by the Hon'ble Governor and Chief Minister of the state in November, 2022.
- 2015: Swami Rama Humanitarian Award 2015 presented by Hon. Chief Minister of Uttarakhand.
- 2015: Vivekananda Seva Samman 2015 presented by Hon. Governor, West Bengal.
- 2015: Bhaorao Deoras Seva Samman 2015 presented at Lucknow by Hon Governor, Uttar Pradesh.
- 2014: IIT Kharagpur's 'Distinguished Alumnus Award' (youngest recipient in the history of the award) awarded in 2014.
- 2014: Swami Ranganathananda Memorial Humanitarian Award 2014 presented at the Ramakrishna Mission Institute of Culture Calcutta.
- 2014: Telegraph 'Special Honour' conferred by Telegraph Educa:tion Foundation Calcutta in 2014.
- 2013: IIM Calcutta's Distinguished Alumnus Award (1 of 9 recipients out of 8000 alumni).
- 2012: CNN-IBN's Young Indian Leader of the Year Award 2012.
- 2011: National Award for Child Welfare 2011 presented by the President of India at the Rashtrapati Bhavan.
- 2011: Sanskriti Award, India's premier award for young achievers in 2011 from the Former President of India Dr A. P. J. Abdul Kalam.
