= P. M. Murty =

Indian business executive

- Citizenship: India
- Education: IIM Calcutta
- Occupations: Former MD & CEO of Asian Paints

P. M. Murty is an Indian business executive. He was the former Managing Director and Chief Executive Officer of Asian Paints, the largest Indian paint company. Murty, who joined Asian Paints in 1971, had retired in 2008 as the head of decorative business of the organization. However, when the promoters of Asian Paints decided to step down from their executive positions, Murty was hired as the new professional chief executive. Under Murty's leadership, Asian Paints scaled new heights, becoming the fourth largest decorative paint-maker in the world. In recognition of his achievements, he was awarded the "CEO of the Year" award for 2009-'10 by Business Standard, a leading Indian business publication.

Murty is an alumnus of Indian Institute of Management Calcutta.
