= C. V. Madhukar =

Indian financier

- Born: 1968 (age 56–57); India
- Occupation: Public policy research
- Known for: PRS Legislative Research and Co-Develop

C. V. Madhukar (born 1968) is an Indian public policy leader and impact investor. He is the Chief Executive Officer of Co-Develop, a global nonprofit fund that supports countries in building inclusive and equitable digital public infrastructure (DPI). He was previously an Investment Partner at the Omidyar Network, where he led the firm’s global work on digital identity.

== Education ==
Madhukar holds a Master in Public Administration (MPA) from the John F. Kennedy School of Government at Harvard University, where he was an Edward S. Mason Fellow. He earned an MBA in Finance from the University of Houston and a bachelor’s degree in Civil Engineering from Bangalore University.

== Career ==
Madhukar began his career in 1993 as an investment banker with ICICI Securities and Finance Company in Mumbai, where he worked on the disinvestment of large public sector enterprises.

He contributed to the early growth of the education NGO Pratham and was part of its original executive group in Mumbai. In 2000, at the invitation of the Government of Karnataka, he co-founded and managed the Akshara Foundation, an education initiative in Bengaluru. Around the same time, he helped establish the Azim Premji Foundation, which supports the use of technology in rural schools.

Madhukar later worked at the World Bank in Washington, D.C., focusing on parliamentary capacity-building across emerging economies.

In 2005, he co-founded PRS Legislative Research, a nonpartisan institution that provides analysis of the work of the Parliament of India. PRS publishes legislative briefs on bills and provides nonpartisan research support to Members of Parliament.

Madhukar was later an Investment Partner and Managing Director at the Omidyar Network, where he led its global work on digital identity and digital public infrastructure. In this role, he also oversaw work on governance and citizen engagement in India and Myanmar.

Since 2022, Madhukar has served as CEO of Co-Develop. In this role, he works with governments, multilaterals, and philanthropies to help countries design and implement DPI systems such as digital identity, payment platforms, and data exchange systems. At the 2024 Global DPI Summit in Cairo, he called for more than 100 DPI implementations worldwide by 2025, describing the effort as “laying the plumbing” for digital transformation.

== Fellowships and recognition ==
Madhukar is a Fellow of Echoing Green, Ashoka, and Eisenhower Fellowships. In 2008, he was named a Young Global Leader by the World Economic Forum.
