= Ajit Balakrishnan =

Indian businessman

- Born: 22 July 1948 (age 78)
- Citizenship: India
- Education: IIM Calcutta; University of Kerala
- Occupations: Chairman Emeritus & Founder of Rediff.com

Ajit Balakrishnan is an Indian entrepreneur, business executive and administrator. He is the founder, current chairman-Emeritus of Rediff.com, an internet company based in Mumbai. He was chairman of the Board of Governors of Indian Institute of Management Calcutta (IIM Calcutta) for two five-year terms ending in March 2017.

== Education ==
Balakrishnan holds a Bachelor of Science from the University of Kerala and an MBA from Indian Institute of Management Calcutta (1971).

== Business ==
Balakrishnan's first business was Rediffusion, now known as Rediffusion DY&R (Dentsu Young & Rubicam), which he co-founded when he was 22. In 1995, he founded Rediff.com, which became a highly successful internet site, and was listed on NASDAQ in 2001.

== Writing ==
He has written columns in the past for Business Standard and has written a book published by Macmillan Publishers called The Wave Rider. He has co-authored a research paper, Generic Framework for a Recommendation System using Collective Intelligence, with Alkesh Patel, which was presented at the International Conference on Internet Technology and Secured Transactions, 2009. He has recently (9th January 2026) written another book:Technology Innovation: Sword or Plough. Inkscribe Publishing. ISBN 978-1-971036-98-4.

== Public service ==
Balakrishnan served as the Chairman of the Board of Governors of IIM Calcutta for two five-year terms ending in March 2017. He has in the past served on the Governing Council of Centre for Development of Advanced Computing (CDAC). He was named Chairman Emeritus of the Internet and Mobile Association of India (IAMAI). He served as the chairman of the Govt of India, Ministry of Information Technology Working Group on Internet Governance and Proliferation. He chaired a committee appointed by India's Ministry of Human Resource Development on 'Research and Faculty Enhancement at the 7 IIMs'. He was a member of the Central Advisory Board of Education of the Government of India.

== Awards and recognition ==
Ajit is mentioned as one of the pioneering Indian dotcom founders of the 21st century.
