= K. T. Chandy =

Indian management education administrator

- Born: 13 January 1913
- Died: 2 May 2006 (aged 93); Kottayam, Kerala, India
- Occupations: Director, IIM Calcutta; Chairman, Food Corporation of India
- Known for: Founder-Director of Indian Institute of Management Calcutta

K.T. Chandy (13 January 1913 – 2 May 2006) was an Indian management education administrator and business executive. He was the founder-director of Indian Institute of Management Calcutta, the first Indian Institute of Management.

== Early life and education ==
Chandy was born on 13 January 1913. After graduating from Madras Christian College in 1932, he got a bachelor's degree in law (LLB) from Bombay University and then a Master's degree in law (LLM) from London School of Economics and studied for Bar-at-law at Middle Temple.

== Career ==
In his career in business, Chandy worked in and led various companies. He became a Director of Lever Brothers in 1956 and played an important role in the formation of Hindustan Lever Limited, which was later renamed as Hindustan Unilever. He later became the chairman of the company.

In 1961, Bidhan Chandra Roy, the then Chief Minister of West Bengal, invited Chandy to help set up the first Indian Institute of Management at Calcutta. He served as the director of the institute, named Indian Institute of Management Calcutta, for five years.

K.T. Chandy is considered one of the global pioneers of social marketing, the practice of applying commercial marketing approaches for behaviour change and social benefit. In 1963, the Central Family Planning Board of the Government of India set up an Evaluation Committee to examine the current national family planning program and make suggestions for improvements to be incorporated into India's Fourth Five Year Plan. A subcommittee on contraceptive materials was organized. This subcommittee requested one of its members, Mr. K. T. Chandy, then Director of the Indian Institute of Management, Calcutta, to call upon members of private industry in India to consider ways of extending the distribution of contraceptive services, especially the condom, through commercial channels.

Chandy was appointed as the Chairman of Food Corporation of India in 1967. In 1968, he became the Chairman of Hindustan Steel Limited, which is now a part of Steel Authority of India Limited. In 1972, he returned to his home state of Kerala and took over as the Chairman of Kerala State Industries Development Corporation (KSIDC), a position in which he served till 1978.
