= Nishi Vasudeva =

HPCL, Chairman

- Born: 30 March 1956 (age 70)
- Education: B.A, MBA
- Alma mater: IIM Calcutta
- Occupation: Business executive
- Employer: Hindustan Petroleum
- Awards: Most Powerful Women in Indian Business by Business Today

Nishi Vasudeva (born 30 March 1956) is an Indian business executive. She is a former Chairman and Managing Director (CMD) of Hindustan Petroleum Corporation Limited (HPCL), an Indian state-owned oil and gas corporation and India's fourth largest company by revenue. She is the first woman ever to head a Navratna PSU.

== Background ==
Vasudeva is a 1977 batch MBA graduate of Indian Institute of Management Calcutta.

== Career ==
Nishi Vasudeva began her career in the petroleum industry with Engineers India Ltd. Over the years, she held several significant positions, progressively rising through the ranks within the sector.

From 1994 to 2000, she served as Deputy General Manager (ERP) at the head office. Following this, from 2000 to 2002, she was appointed as General Manager (Corporate Planning). Between 2002 and 2010, Vasudeva took on the roles of General Manager and Executive Director (IT), also at the head office. From 2011 to 2012, she held the position of Executive Director (LPG). She was then promoted to Director of Marketing from 2012 to 2014.

In 2014, Nishi Vasudeva was appointed Chairman and Managing Director (CMD) of Hindustan Petroleum Corporation Limited (HPCL), a role she held until 2016. Prior to becoming CMD, she served as the Director of Marketing and Executive Director of Marketing Coordination. Vasudeva has accumulated over 34 years of experience in the petroleum industry.

== Awards ==
Nishi Vasudeva was recognized as the "Asia CEO of the Year" in 2015 by Platts. She also received the "Global CEO of the Year" award at the Platts Global Energy Awards.
