= De Gournay =

English wallpaper company

de Gournay is a British company known for its hand-painted wallpapers.

== History ==
The company was founded by Claud Cecil Gurney in 1986, in the basement of his family's home. The company takes its name from the medieval French spelling of the Gurney family name. Gurney began the company after touring Chinese factories that specialized in hand-painting.

de Gournay's wallpapers are produced mainly in China, at its Shanghai studio. The company has worked with designers such as India Mahdavi, John Stefanidis, Michael S. Smith, Kate Moss and Martyn Lawrence Bullard to create custom wallpaper designs.

In December 2024, de Gournay collaborated with Indian designer Vikram Goyal to develop a collection of three gilded wallpapers.

== Books ==
- de Gournay: Hand-Painted Interiors 2020, Rizzoli.
