= Radha Krishna Temple of Dallas =

Radha Krishna temple in Texas, USA

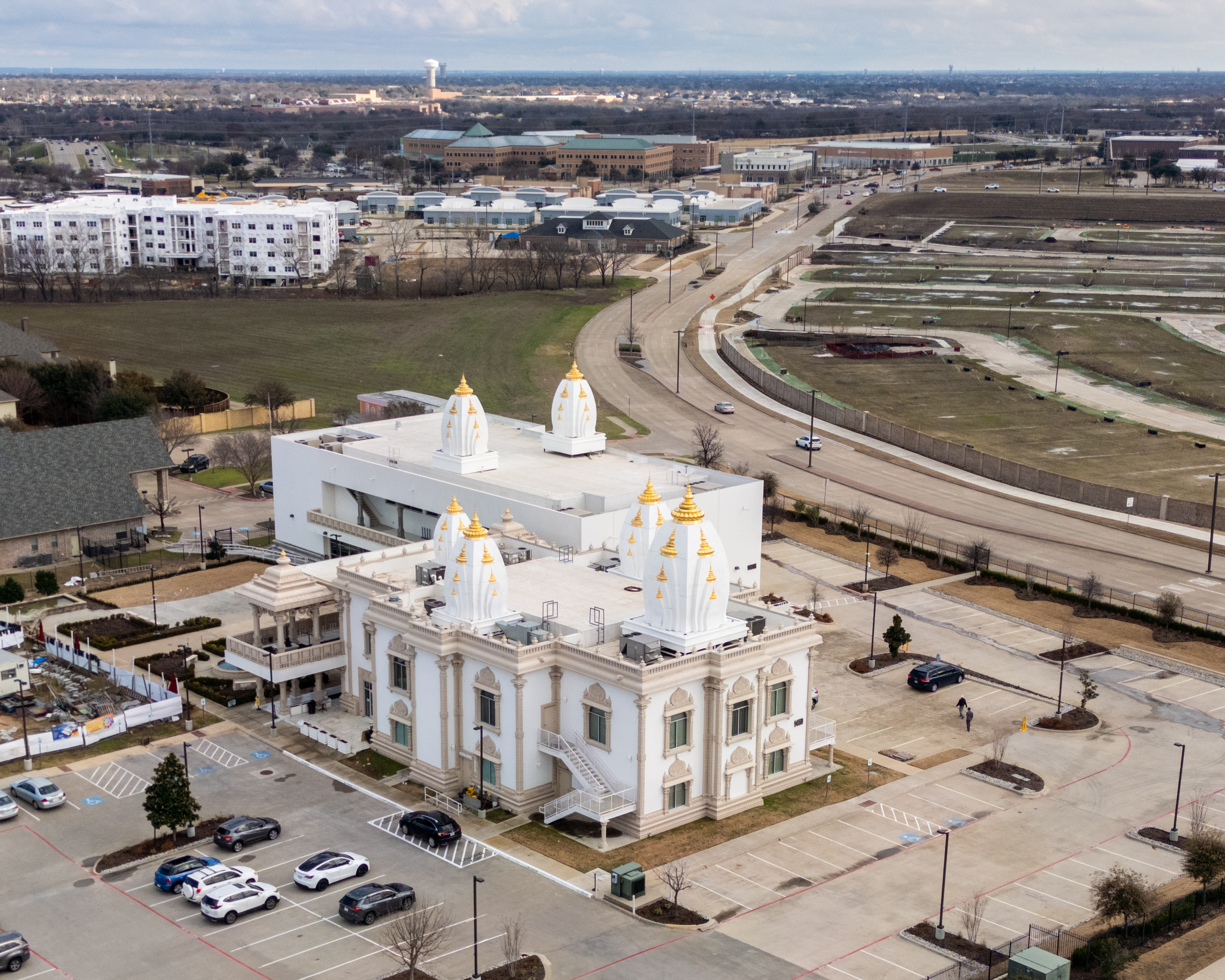
- Aerial view of the Radha Krishna Temple of Dallas in Allen, Texas

- Location in Texas

Religion
- Affiliation: Hinduism
- Deity: Radha Krishna
- Festivals: Janmashtami, Radhastami, Diwali, Holi, Navaratri, Ganesh Chaturthi

Location
- Location: Allen
- State: Texas
- Country: United States
- Coordinates: 33.121133°N 96.680161°W

Architecture
- Creator: Swami Mukundananda
- Completed: 04 July 2017

Website
- http://radhakrishnatemple.net

Radha Krishna Temple of Dallas is a Hindu temple located in Allen, Texas. It was established by JKYog, under the leadership of Swami Mukundananda.

The opening ceremonies and consecration (Pratiṣṭhavidhi) were held over eight days, 4–11 July 2017. The ceremony was attended by the mayors of Allen and Frisco, other dignitaries, and thousands of people from the nearby community. Life-sized statues of Radha and Krishna were unveiled on 9 July 2017. Statues of Ram, Sita, Hanuman, and Ganesh were later added.

The temple was built according to guidelines for temple architecture set out in the Shilpa Shastra.

The construction of the Center for Education and Culture started in May 2020 with Bhoomi Poojan ceremony. The 20,000 square feet building will have facilities for cultural programs, wedding ceremonies, youth leadership workshops, children's classes, yoga, meditation classes, and other community activities.

== Festivals and events ==
The Radha Krishna Temple of Dallas celebrates all the major Hindu festival, and hosts educational and spiritual programs throughout the year.

=== Annual religious festivals ===
The temple celebrates major Hindu festivals, including Diwali, Holi, Krishna Janmashtami, Radhashtami, Navaratri, and Ganesh Chaturthi.

The temple's Navratri celebrations include traditional worship, Garba, Dandiya Raas, and observances associated with Dussehra.

Ganesh Mahotsav activities include puja, abhishekam, aarti, devotional gatherings, and Ganesh Visarjan.

In November 2026, the temple held its annual Diwali Mahotsav, an event that drew thousands of attendees and devotees from across North Texas. The multi-day festival featured traditional pooja (worship) services led by spiritual leader Swami Mukundananda, cultural programs, a Ram Leela performance, a food festival, and a large pyrotechnic display. For the main event, volunteers and temple members set up a ceremonial display consisting of 11,111 diyas.

The City of Allen also proclaimed Diwali Festival of Lights Week, recognizing the festival's cultural traditions and the temple's role in community celebrations.

=== Cultural, educational and spiritual activities ===
In addition to religious festivals, the Radha Krishna Temple of Dallas organizes cultural and educational programs for different age groups. These include Sanskriti, a recurring cultural program featuring competitions and activities for children and young people, as well as language classes in Hindi, Marathi, Gujarati, and Telugu, and Toastmasters-related public speaking activities.

The temple also offers classes on the Bhagavad Gita and holds regular satsang gatherings featuring spiritual discourses, devotional singing (bhajans and kirtans), and aarti. Other activities include yoga, meditation, and Vishnu Sahasranama chanting.

The temple also provides religious and ceremonial services, including traditional Hindu pujas, Griha Pravesh (housewarming ceremonies), vehicle blessings, wedding ceremonies, and devotional kirtans at private residences. Astrology services are also listed among its offerings.

== Facilities and services ==
The Radha Krishna Temple of Dallas provides event spaces for weddings, cultural gatherings, community functions, and other ceremonies. Its facilities include the Main Hall and Ballroom in the CICE Building, Seva Kunj in the temple building, and a Wellness Center. The temple also offers event-related services, including catering, decoration, audiovisual arrangements, and Hindu priest services.

The temple operates the Yugal Kunj Cafeteria, which serves vegetarian Indian cuisine, including sattvic meals and traditional dishes. The cafeteria also provides tiffin services and food offerings associated with religious festivals.
