= Mukundananda =

Indian religious teacher

Swami Mukundananda
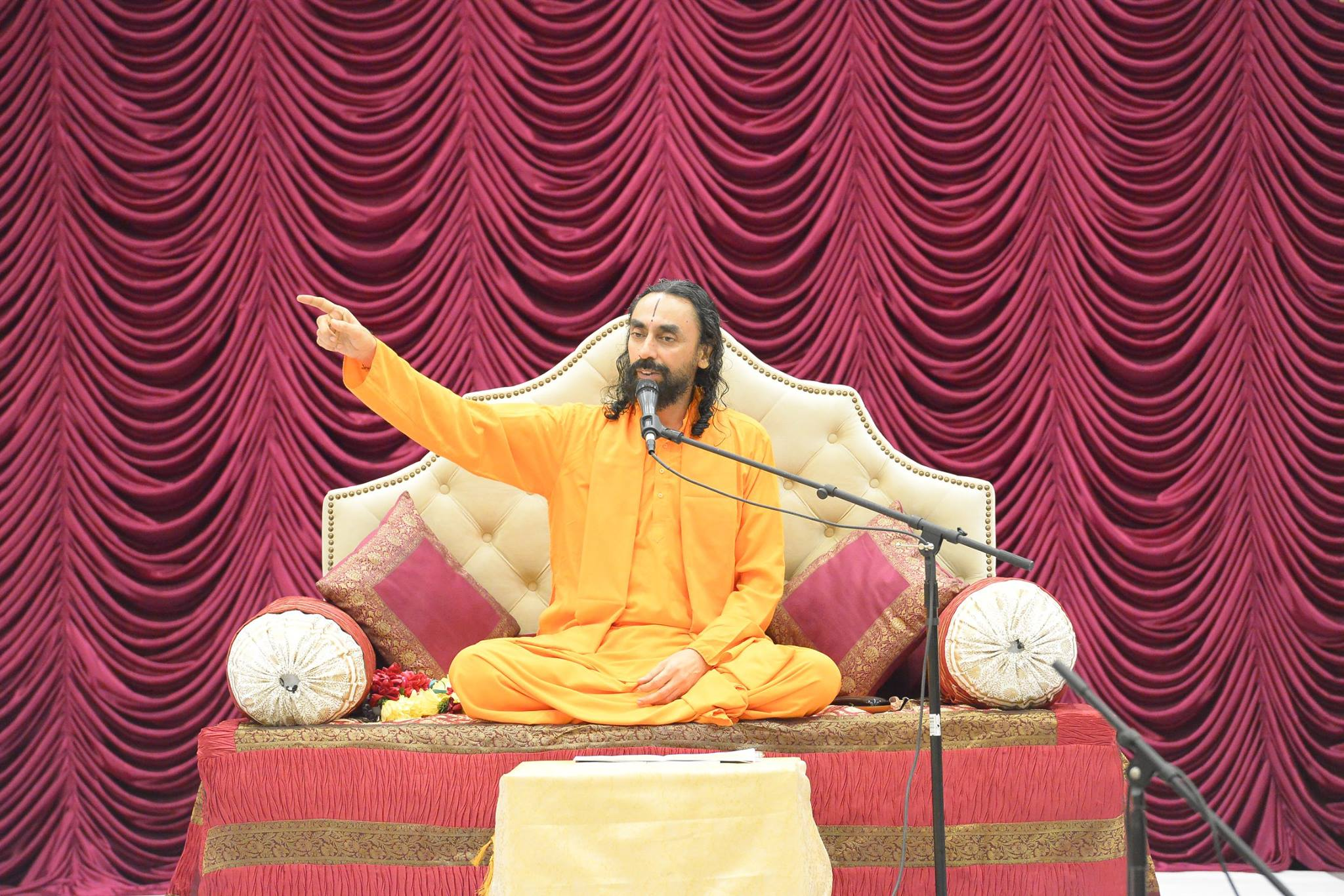

Personal life
- Born: 19 December 1960 India
- Education: Indian Institute of Technology, Delhi (B Tech); Indian Institute of Management, Calcutta (MBA)
- Website: swamimukundananda.org

Religious life
- Religion: Hinduism
- Founder of: JKYog, JKYog India, Radha Krishna Temple, Dallas
- Philosophy: Bhakti yoga

Religious career
- Teacher: Kripalu Maharaj

Swami Mukundananda is an Indian spiritual teacher, author, monk, and founder of the Jagadguru Kripaluji Yog (JKYog) organization.

== Biography ==
=== Early life and education ===
Swami Mukundananda finished his B.Tech. from Indian Institute of Technology (IIT), Delhi. He then completed his MBA from the Indian Institute of Management (IIM), Kolkata. After working for a brief time in a corporate house in India, he renounced his professional career to take sannyasa to pursue spiritual life.

=== Pursuit of spirituality ===
During his travels, Swami Mukundananda met many saints in India, read writings of the saints of the past, and lived in various holy places. Ultimately, he became a disciple of Jagadguru Kripaluji Maharaj. Under his guidance, he practiced sadhana and studied the Vedic scriptures and the Indian and Western systems of philosophy. Since then, Swami Mukundananda has been traveling to various countries to conduct programs and retreats on spirituality, yoga, and meditation.

== JKYog ==
JKYog (Jagadguru Kripaluji Yog) is a non-profit charitable organization founded by Swami Mukundananda. JKYog in USA is headquartered at the Radha Krishna Temple in Dallas, Texas. JKYog in India, also known as Jagadguru Kripalu Yog Trust, is headquartered at the Jagadguru Kripalu University Campus, in Banara, Odisha.

The main aim of JKYog is to teach the knowledge of the Vedic scriptures, including the Upanishads, Puranas, and Bhagavad Gita.

=== Teachings and philosophy ===
Swami Mukundananda is the founder of the Yogic system, JKYog, "Jagadguru Kripalu Yog" also known as Yoga for the Body, Mind and Soul that incorporates physical, mental, intellectual, and spiritual well-being.

Swami Mukundananda speaks and writes on Vedic scriptures in his publications and lectures in a contemporary context. His teachings draw on Bhakti traditions within Hinduism, emphasizing devotional practices and service to humanity and God. He addresses topics related to mental discipline, meditation, and personal improvement.

=== Temples and congregation centres ===
Swami Mukundananda has several religious and community centers in India and the United States. These include the Radha Krishna Temple of Dallas, USA; Radha Krishna Temple, Bay Area, USA; and Radha Krishna Mandir, Cuttack, Odisha, India, the JKYog Ashram, Banara, Odisha, India; and Purushottam Vatika, Puri, Odisha, India.

=== Life Transformation Programs (LTPs) and spiritual retreats ===
Swami Mukundananda leads a series of spiritual programs known as Life Transformation Programs (LTPs) in various locations in the United States and India. These week-long programs include discourses and meditation sessions.

He also leads spiritual retreats in the United States and India. Activities in these retreats include lectures, chanting, and educational programs for children and youth.

=== Jagadguru Kripalu University (JKU) ===
Jagadguru Kripalu University, established in Odisha, India, offers programs across various academic disciplines. According to university publications, it offers programs in Health Sciences, Information Technology, Engineering, Business Studies, and Humanities, as well as programs in Spiritual Sciences, Yogic Studies, and Naturopathy.

=== YouTube Channel ===
Swami Mukundananda maintains a YouTube Channel that features videos on spirituality, meditation, and related topics.

== Bibliography ==
Swami Mukundananda has published several books.

| No. | Title | Publisher | Year | ISBN |
|---|---|---|---|---|
| 1. | Bhagavad Gita: The Song of God | Rupa Publications India | 2022 | ISBN 978-9355204455 |
| 2. | Bhagavad Gita for Everyday Living: Selected Verses with Key Takeaways | Rupa Publications India | 2025 | ISBN 978-9370035225 |
| 3. | Narad Bhakti Sutras: Journey into the Heart of Bhakti | Rupa Publications India | 2025 | ISBN 978-9370033221 |
| 4. | Ishavasya Upanishad | Rupa Publications India | 2025 | ISBN 978-9361560170 |
| 5. | Nourish Your Soul: Inspirations from and Lives of Great Saints | Rupa Publications India | 2024 | ISBN 978-9361563492 |
| 6. | Spiritual Secrets from Hinduism: Essence of the Vedic Scriptures | Rupa Publications India | 2024 | ISBN 978-9361562624 |
| 7. | Questions You Always Wanted to Ask | Rupa Publications India | 2023 | ISBN 978-9357025713 |
| 8. | The Art and Science of Happiness | Penguin Ananda | 2023 | ISBN 978-0143452348 |
| 9. | Golden Rules for Living Your Best Life | Rupa Publications India | 2022 | ISBN 978-9355207883 |
| 10. | The Power of Thoughts | Penguin Random House India | 2022 | ISBN 978-0143452331 |
| 11. | 7 Divine Laws to Awaken Your Best Self | Rupa Publications India | 2023 | ISBN 978-9357025829 |
| 12. | The Science of Mind Management^{*} | Rupa Publications India | 2022 | ISBN 978-9355204523 |
| 13. | 7 Mindsets for Success, Happiness and Fulfilment | Rupa Publications India | 2022 | ISBN 978-9355204387 |
| 14. | Spiritual Dialectics | Radha Govind Dham Publication Unit | 2011 | ISBN 978-0982667590 |
| 15. | Yoga for the Body, Mind & Soul | Radha Govind Dham Publication Unit | 2011 | ISBN 978-8193768921 |
| 16. | Science of Healthy Diet | Jagadguru Kripaluji Yog | 2017 | ISBN 978-0996869317 |
| 17. | Essence of Hinduism | Radha Govind Dham Publication Unit | 2011 | ISBN 978-0982667583 |
| 18. | My Wisdom Book: Everyday Shlokas, Mantras, Bhajans and More | Rupa Publications India | 2022 | ISBN 978-9355204509 |
| 19. | My Best Friend Krishna | Jagadguru Kripaluji Yog | 2016 | ISBN 978-0-9968693-0-0 |
| 20. | Healthy Body Healthy Mind: Yoga for Children | Jagadguru Kripaluji Yog | 2011 | ISBN 978-0-9833967-0-3 |
| 21. | Inspiring Stories for Children, Vol. 1 | Jagadguru Kripaluji Yog | 2014 | ISBN 978-0996869379 |
| 22. | Inspiring Stories for Children, Vol. 2 | Jagadguru Kripaluji Yog | 2014 | ISBN 978-0996869386 |
| 23. | Inspiring Stories for Children, Vol. 3 | Jagadguru Kripaluji Yog | 2014 | ISBN 978-0996869393 |
| 24. | Inspiring Stories for Children, Vol. 4 | Jagadguru Kripaluji Yog | 2014 | ISBN 978-1962282000 |

* Ranked second in the Hindustan Times Neilson's bestseller list.

== Gallery ==
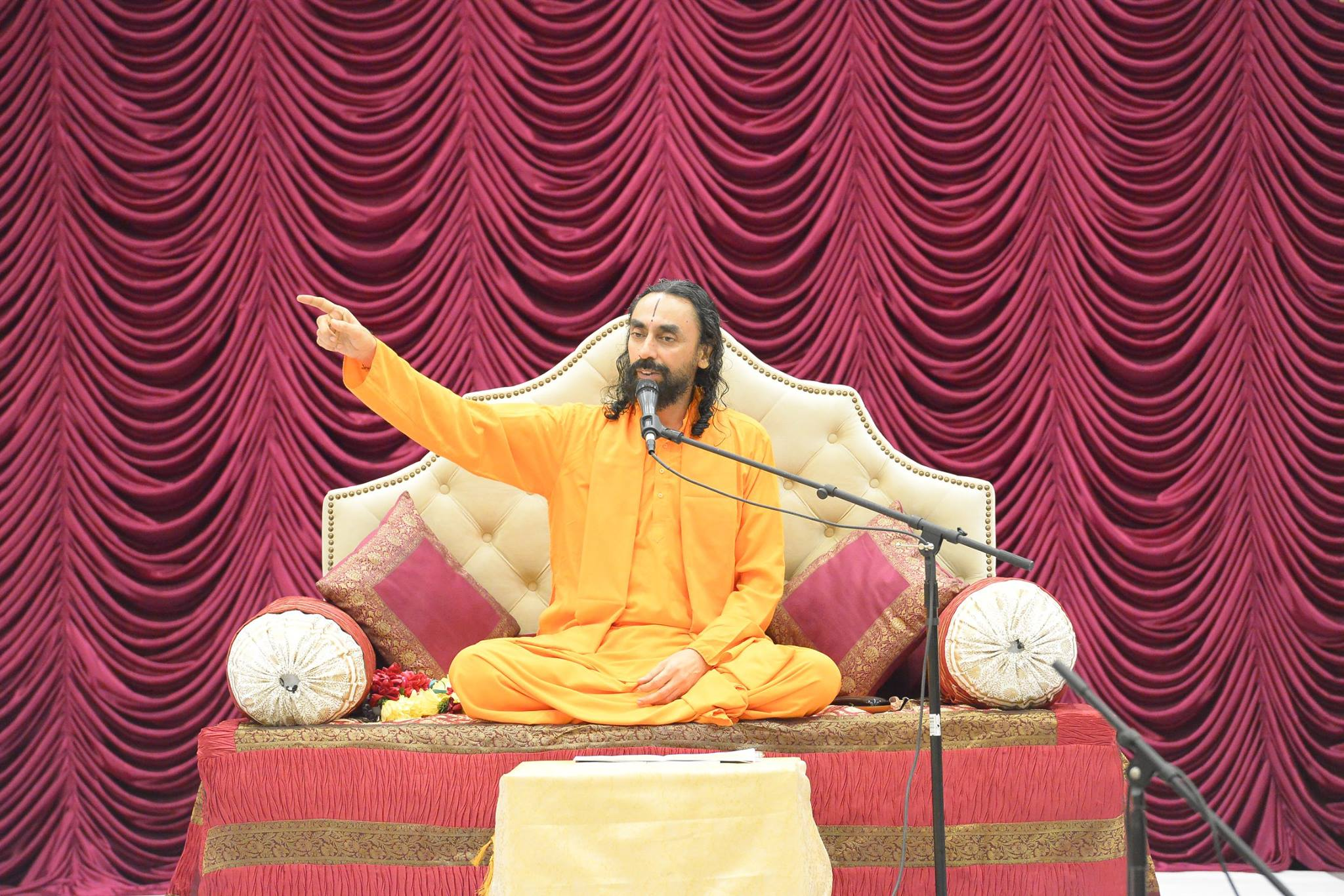
Retreat Lecture

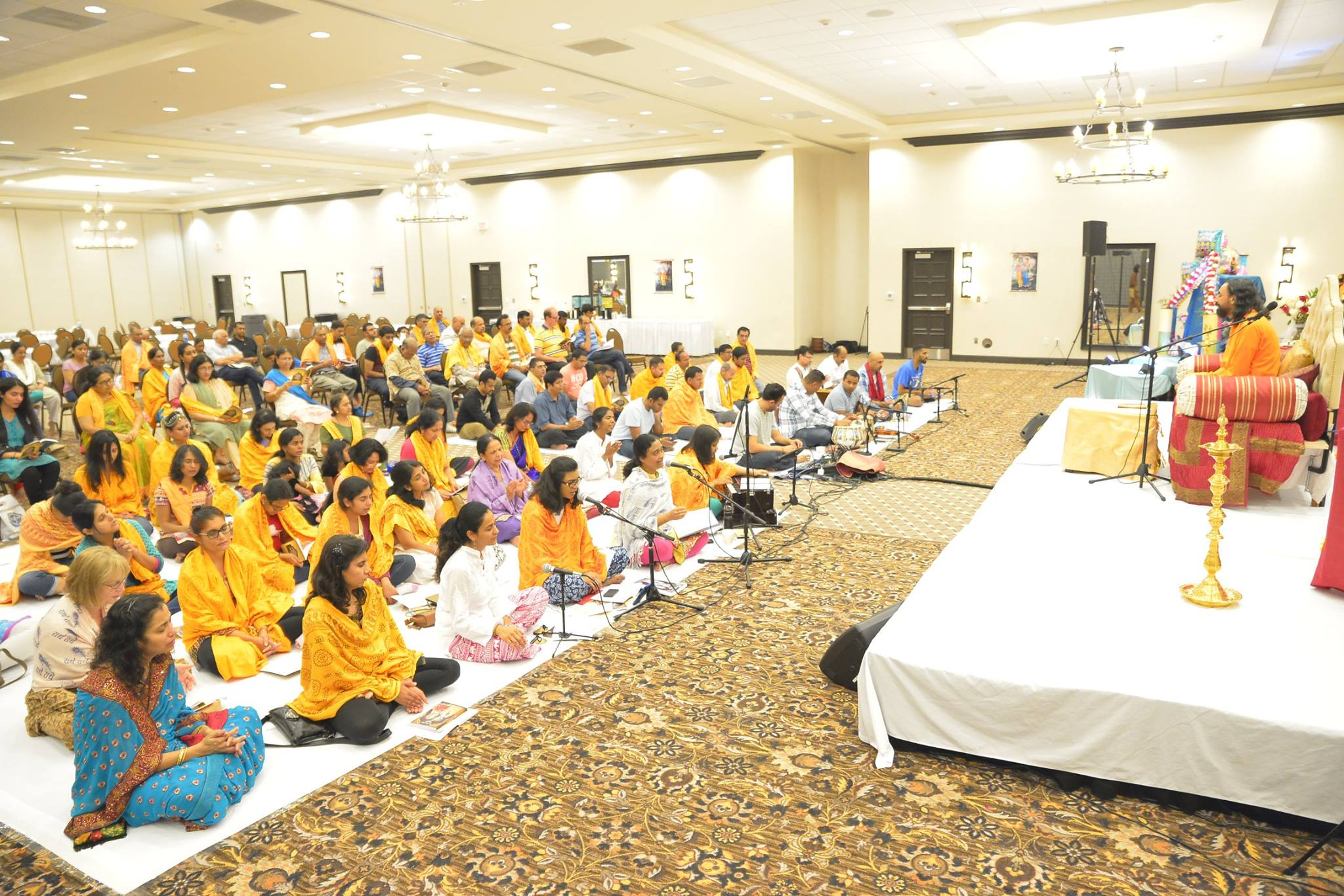
Retreat Discourse

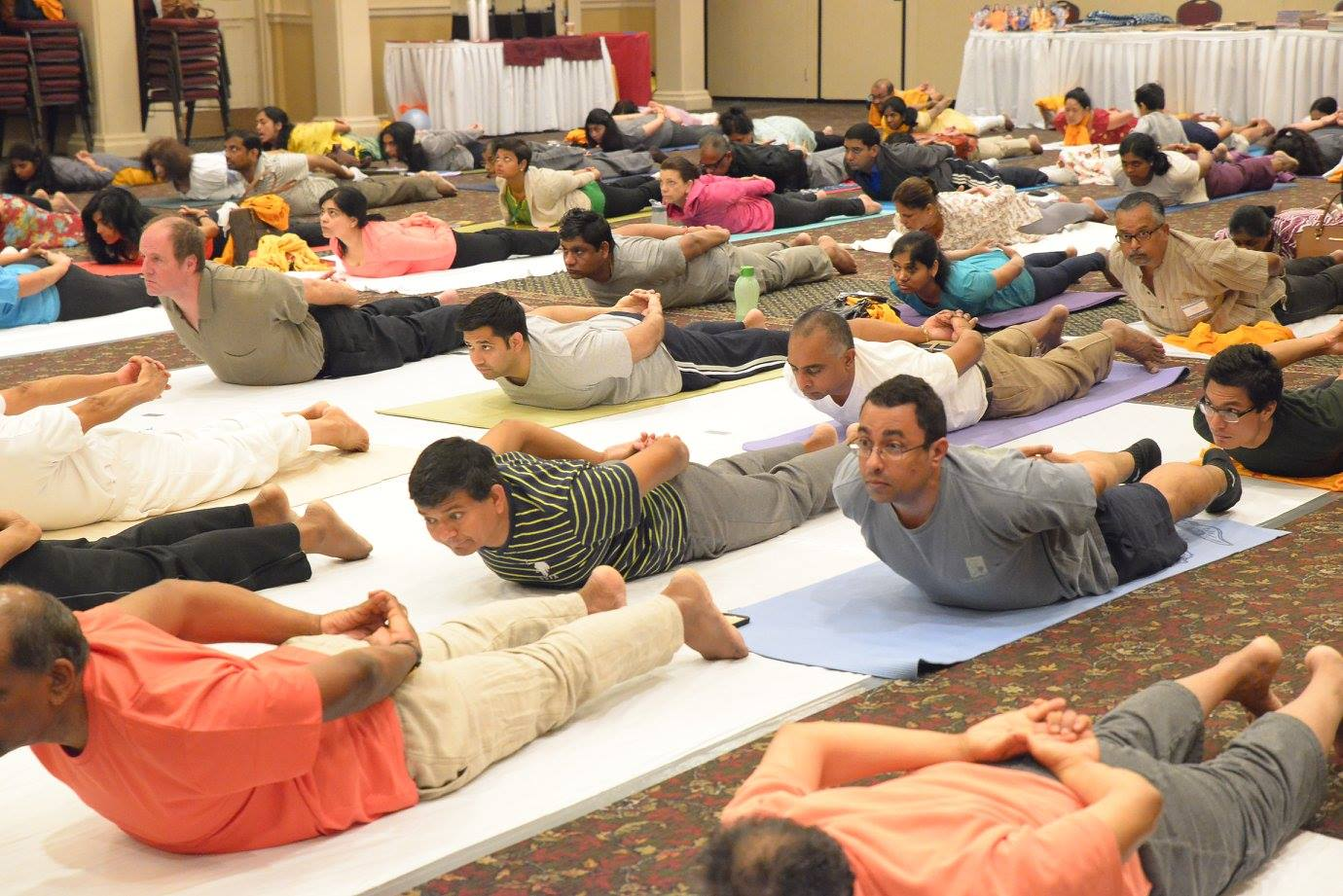
Retreat Yoga

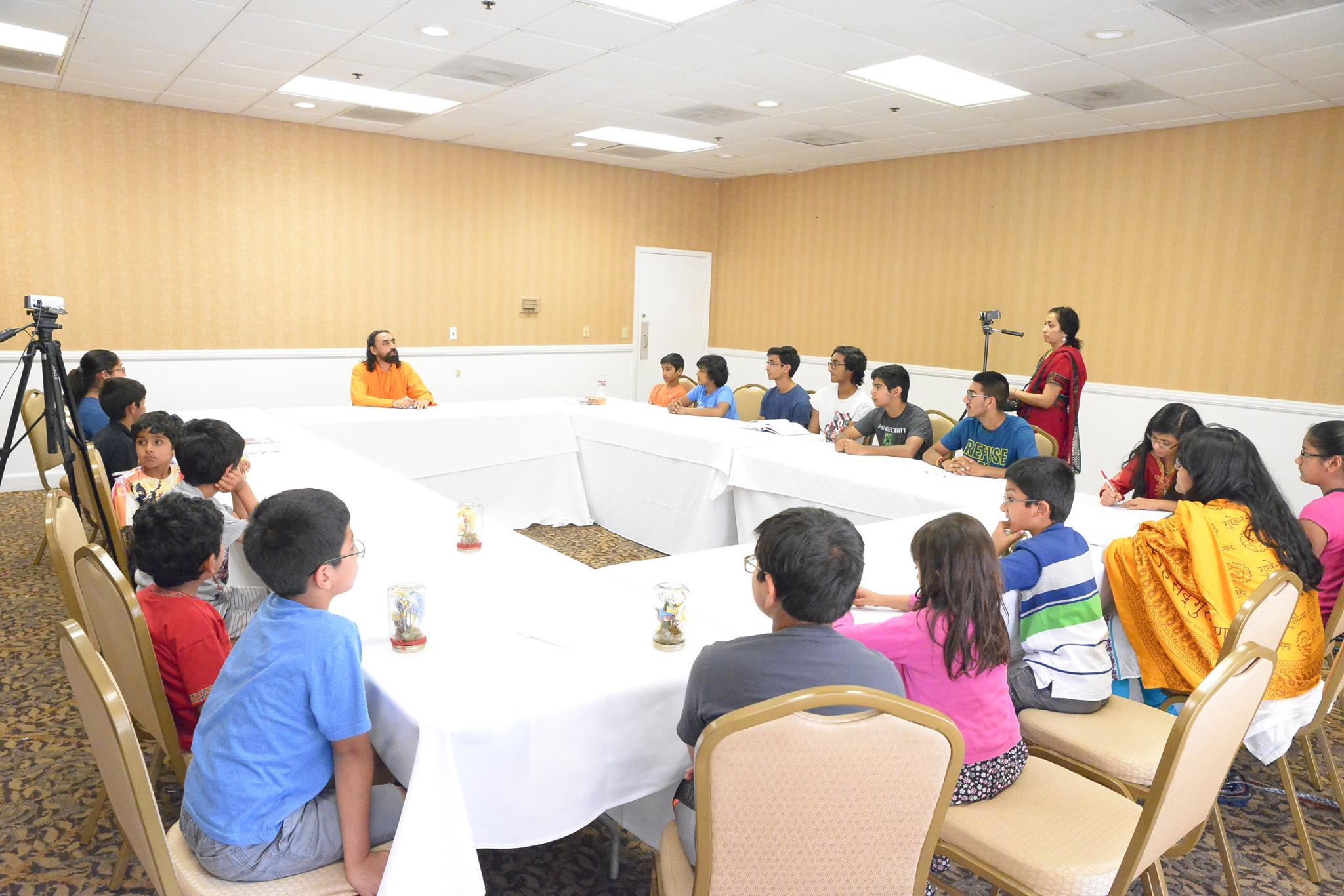
Retreat Bal-Mukund

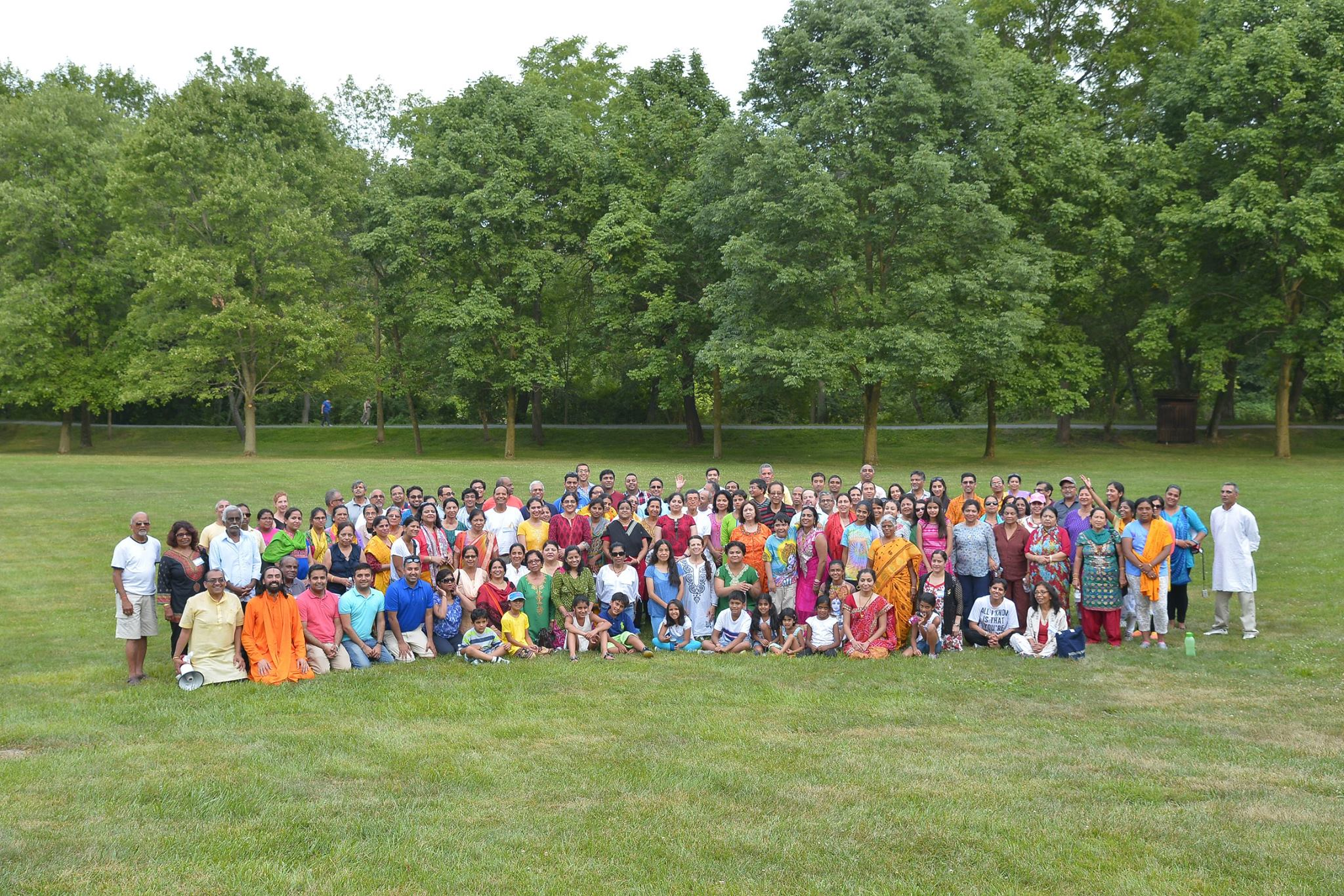
Retreat Parikrama
