= Hajara Beebi Ismail =

Indian freedom fighter (1910– 1994 )

- Born: 22 December 1910; Guntur, Andhra Pradesh, India
- Died: 16 June 1994 (aged 83)
- Movement: Indian independence movement
- Spouse: Muhammad Ismail

Hajara Beebi Ismail (22 December 1910– 16 June 1994) was an Indian freedom fighter and social worker. She was the wife of Mohammed Ismail Saheb, who was also a freedom fighter from Tenali of Guntur district in Andhra Pradesh.

== Early life and background ==
She was born in Guntur, Andhra Pradesh. She was influenced by Mahatma Gandhi and dedicated themselves to the Khadi Campaign Movement.

== Life ==
Hajara Beebi played a crucial role in supporting her husband, Mohammed Ismail, during his involvement in the Khadi Movement. Ismail gained recognition as 'Khaddar Ismail' for establishing the first Khaddar Store in the Guntur district. Despite facing challenges from the Muslim League, which had a strong presence in Tenali, the couple remained committed to Mahatma Gandhi's ideology. Hajara Beebi actively assisted the activists of the Indian National Movement who sought refuge in their home.

Even in the face of adversity, Hajara Beebi Ismail remained resilient as her husband faced multiple arrests for his participation in the national movement. The couple prioritized their children's education, ensuring they received instruction in a school that instilled nationalist values. As a result, their daughters attended a Hindi School that fostered a spirit of patriotism.

== Death ==
Hajara Beebi Ismail a committed Khadi activist, continued to wear Khadi until her death. She entrusted the running of their Khadi Store to her children after her husband. She died on 16 June 1994 in Tenali.
