= Rediff.com =

Indian news and entertainment website

Rediff
- Company type: Public
- Website type: Web portal
- Available in: English
- Founded: January 1996; 30 years ago
- Headquarters: Mumbai, India
- Owner: Infibeam Avenues Limited (since October 2024)
- Key people: Vishal Mehta (Chairman & MD)
- Industry: Internet
- Revenue: ₹360 million (FY23–24)
- Net income: ₹8 million (2021)
- Employees: 316 (Dec 2009)
- Website: rediff.com
- Commercial: Yes
- Registration: Optional
- Launched: 8 February 1997 (29 years ago)
- Current status: Active

Rediff.com, stylised as rediff.com, is an Indian news, information, entertainment, email service and shopping website. Founded by Ajit Balakrishnan in 1996, it was the first Indian website to become a mainstream news media organisation. It is headquartered in Mumbai with offices in Bengaluru, New Delhi, and New York City.

As of 2009, it had more than 300 employees. At the time of its founding, internet access had only been available in India for five months with a mere 18,000 users, leaving Rediff.com as one of the earliest Indian web portals and email providers.

== History ==
The Rediff.com domain was registered in India in 1996. Early products included the email service Rediffmail and Rediff Shopping, an online marketplace selling electronics and peripherals.

In 2001, Rediff.com was alleged to be in violation of the Securities Act of 1933 for filing a materially false prospectus in relation to an IPO of its American depositary shares. The case was resolved by settlement in 2009.

In April 2001, Rediff.com acquired the India Abroad newspaper.

In 2007, Rediff iShare, a multimedia platform, was released. In 2010, Rediffmail NG was launched, an email service for mobile platforms. In 2012, Rediff launched its Android App for Rediff News.

In April 2016, the company decided to delist from NASDAQ, citing the high cost of reporting requirements, given its financial condition.

== Infibeam Avenues Limited's era ==
In 2024, Rediff.com became a subsidiary of Infibeam Avenues, which acquired a 54.1% controlling stake in Rediff.com India Ltd. Infibeam founder Vishal Mehta became Rediff's new Chairman and Managing Director, succeeding Ajit Balakrishnan, who had led the company since its founding in 1996.

== See also ==
- Comparison of web search engines
- List of search engines
- Timeline of web search engines
- Noviforum
