= CreditAccess Grameen =

Non-Banking Financial Company

CreditAccess Grameen Limited
- Type: Public Ltd. Co.
- Traded as: NSE: CREDITACC, BSE: 541770
- Industry: Financial Services
- Founded: 1999
- Headquarters: Bengaluru, India
- Number of locations: 1,967
- Area served: 16 states & 1 union territory
- Key people: Udaya Kumar Hebbar (Managing Director); Ganesh Narayanan (Chief Executive Officer)
- Services: Financial services
- Revenue: ▲₹5,173 crore (US$540 million) (2024)
- Net income: ▲₹1,446 crore (US$150 million) (2024)
- Total assets: ▲₹28,846 crore (US$3.0 billion) (2024)
- Total equity: ▲₹6,570 crore (US$680 million) (2024)
- Number of employees: 19,395 (2024)
- Rating: AA− stable
- Website: www.creditaccessgrameen.in

CreditAccess Grameen Limited (CA Grameen) is an Indian microfinance institution founded in 1999, headquartered in Bengaluru, which serves customers predominantly in rural areas. The company is engaged in providing microfinance services to women from low-income households who are enrolled as members and organized in Joint Liability Groups.

== History ==
CreditAccess Grameen (CA Grameen) was established in 1999 by Vinatha M. Reddy, who was inspired by the book “Give Us Credit” by Alex Counts, President & CEO of Grameen Foundation USA.

Reddy, who was then running an NGO named the T. Muniswammapa Trust, managed to obtain a US$35,000 grant from the Grameen Foundation to replicate the model in India. As a result, Grameen Koota was born, and as the concept became more popular.

In 2007, the company was renamed Grameen Financial Services Private Limited.

On March 14, 2008, the company changed its name, following which the Reserve Bank of India (RBI) issued a updated Certificate of Registration on July 28, 20092, to reflect the corporate name change.

Since then, the former owners have made way for new promoters, including CreditAccess India B.V., a Dutch-based Asia-focused microfinance major that has invested INR 968 crore in CA Grameen since 2009. Udaya Kumar Hebbar joined as CEO in 2010, and has acquired a larger role as MD and CEO since 2016.

On 23 August 2018, the company was listed on National Stock Exchange and Bombay Stock Exchange following its initial public offering.

In September 2019, Citigroup partnered with CA Grameen to finance 75,000 Women Entrepreneurs in India.

CreditAccess Grameen acquired Madura Micro Finance at the deal of INR 876 crore in November 2019.

CA Grameen also invested INR 150 crore through subordinated debt in Madura Micro Finance in December 2021.

U.S. International Development Finance Corporation, the US Government's development finance institution signed a loan agreement of US$35 million with CA Grameen in November 2022.

In June 2023, CA Grameen signed a syndicated social loan facility of up to US$200 million, the first in the microfinance industry and the fourth in the country.

Ganesh Narayanan was appointed as the CEO with effect from August 1, 2023, while Udaya Kumar Hebbar continues to oversee the firm as MD.

In 2026, CreditAccess Grameen received Platinum Winner honors at the Global ESG Awards in the Women Empowerment category. The award recognizes institutions's commitment to gender inclusion and its work serving 4.5 million women borrowers in rural India.

== Operations ==
As of June 2026, the company's footprint spans 16 states and 1 UT, and has network of 2,276 branches with over 21,981 employees, serving more than 44 lakh customers.
