= Bajaj Consumer Care =

Indian consumer goods company pvt ltd

Bajaj Consumer Care Ltd.
- Type: Public
- Traded as: BSE: 533229; NSE: BAJAJCON
- Industry: Consumer goods,
- Founded: 1930; 96 years ago
- Founder: Jamnalal Bajaj
- Headquarters: Andheri, Mumbai, India
- Key people: Kushagra Bajaj (Non-Executive chairman); Jaideep Nandi (Managing Director)
- Products: Hair care, Skin care
- Revenue: ▲₹1,028 crore (US$110 million) (2024)
- Net income: ▲₹155 crore (US$16 million) (2024)
- Number of employees: 909 (March 2024)
- Parent: Bajaj Group
- Website: www.bajajconsumercare.com

Bajaj Consumer Care Ltd. (formerly known as Bajaj Corp Ltd.) is an Indian company that manufactures and markets personal care products, primarily in the hair care segment. It is a part of the Bajaj Group, a business conglomerate founded in 1926.

== History ==
It is a subsidiary of the Bajaj Group, which was established by Jamnalal Bajaj. The Bajaj Group is involved in industries such as sugar, consumer goods, power generation, and infrastructure development. In 1953, Kamalnayan Bajaj established Bajaj Sevashram to market and sell hair oils and other beauty products. The Neilsen Retail Audit report indicates that Bajaj Almond Hair Oil holds a 52% market share in the light hair oil category.

In August 2013, Bajaj Consumer Care acquired the skincare brand NOMARKS.

In July 2020, the company appointed Jaideep Nandi as managing director, succeeding Sumit Malhotra, who was stepped down on June 30.

In February 2025, Bajaj Consumer Care acquired Hyderabad-based Vishal Personal Care Pvt. Ltd. for ₹120 crore.
