= Shyam Srinivasan =

Banker

- Born: 2 February 1962 (age 64); Trivandrum, Kerala, India
- Education: Regional Engineering College, Tiruchirappalli (BTech); Indian Institute of Management Calcutta (PGDM)
- Occupations: Banker, company director, author
- Known for: Managing Director and CEO of Federal Bank (2010–2024)
- Notable work: Better Never Stops (2026)
- Title: Executive Chairman, TVS Alternatives; Non-executive Chairman, Fedbank Financial Services
- Spouse: Maya Shyam
- Awards: Business Standard Banker of the Year (2019–20)

Shyam Srinivasan (born 2 February 1962) is an Indian banker, company director and author. He was the managing director and chief executive officer (MD & CEO) of Federal Bank, a private-sector bank headquartered in Aluva, Kerala, from 23 September 2010 to 22 September 2024. Before joining Federal Bank he worked in consumer banking at Citibank and Standard Chartered in India and South-East Asia.

Since leaving Federal Bank, Srinivasan has served as non-executive chairman of Fedbank Financial Services, as senior advisor and operating partner at TVS Capital Funds, and as co-founder and executive chairman of the private credit platform TVS Alternatives (TVS Alts). He is an independent director of ICICI Lombard and the Life Insurance Corporation of India, and a member of the Reserve Bank of India's Advisory Group on Regulation. His first book, Better Never Stops, was published in 2026.

== Early life and education ==
Srinivasan was born in Trivandrum, Kerala. He earned a Bachelor of Technology in industrial production from the Regional Engineering College, Tiruchirappalli (now the National Institute of Technology, Tiruchirappalli), and a postgraduate diploma in management from the Indian Institute of Management Calcutta, where he belonged to the institute's 23rd batch. He later attended a leadership development programme at London Business School.

== Career ==
=== Early career ===
Srinivasan began his career at Wipro before moving into banking. He joined Citibank in India in the early 1990s and held several roles there, leaving in August 2001 as vice-president and chief operating officer of its consumer banking business.

=== Standard Chartered (2001–2010) ===
Srinivasan worked at Standard Chartered from 2001 to 2010. He served as country head of the bank's consumer franchise in Malaysia, with responsibility for strategy, development and management, and was later country manager for its consumer banking business in India. From 2004 to 2010 he was a member of Standard Chartered's Global Executive Forum, a group of the bank's top 100 executives.

=== Federal Bank (2010–2024) ===
==== Appointment and tenure ====
Srinivasan took charge as MD & CEO of Federal Bank on 23 September 2010. At the time the bank's business was concentrated in Kerala and the rest of South India. His appointment was renewed several times with the approval of the Reserve Bank of India: in September 2019 for one year, in 2020 for a further year, and in July 2021 for three years, to 22 September 2024. The three-year renewal in 2021 was longer than market analysts had expected, and the bank's share price rose about 6 per cent on the day it was announced.

On 6 October 2023 Federal Bank asked the Reserve Bank of India to extend Srinivasan's term by one year, which would have taken him to the regulator's 15-year limit for a non-promoter chief executive. Srinivasan's final term ended on 22 September 2024, and he was succeeded by K. V. S. Manian, formerly joint managing director of Kotak Mahindra Bank. In an interview with CNBC-TV18 shortly before his departure, Srinivasan said he would have liked to continue for a few more years.

==== Growth and strategy ====
During Srinivasan's tenure Federal Bank expanded its branch network outside Kerala and increased its retail, small-business and digital banking operations. In a 2021 interview he described the bank as having largely shed its identity as a Kerala-based lender, and said its growth plans included credit cards, microfinance, commercial vehicle loans, gold loans and life insurance. The bank raised ₹2,500 crore of equity capital in June 2017.

According to figures published by the Kerala business magazine Dhanam at the end of his tenure, the bank's key indicators changed as follows:

Indicator	Start of tenure	End of tenure
Market capitalisation	₹6,321 crore	₹45,291 crore
Revenue	₹1,942 crore	₹11,373 crore
Net profit	₹465 crore	₹3,721 crore
Branches	672	1,504
ATMs	732	2,015

In the quarter ended 30 June 2024, the last full quarter of his tenure, the bank reported a then-record quarterly net profit of ₹1,010 crore, with a gross non-performing assets ratio of 2.11 per cent and a net ratio of 0.60 per cent.

Srinivasan's approach to growth was often described as conservative. The jury of the Business Standard Banker of the Year award noted in 2021 that he had built the bank's brand without growing aggressively at the expense of asset quality or provisioning. He himself said he wanted Federal Bank to be "the Dravid of banking", a reference to the cricketer Rahul Dravid, and the "most admired bank" in India. In 2023 Federal Bank was named Bank of the Year (India) by The Banker.

==== Digital banking ====
Srinivasan promoted the bank's digital services, including the FedMobile and FedNet platforms, and partnerships with financial technology companies, under the slogan "Digital at the fore, human at the core". In 2021 he said that more than 86 per cent of the bank's transactions were taking place digitally, following the integration of UPI payments into its mobile application. The bank also retained a large share of India's inward remittance business from non-resident Indians.

==== Corporate social responsibility ====
During his tenure Federal Bank expanded its corporate social responsibility work, which is carried out mainly through the Federal Bank Hormis Memorial Foundation. In 2014 the foundation and The Times of India group launched Speak for India, an inter-collegiate debating competition. In October 2015 the bank opened its first Federal Skill Academy in Kochi to provide vocational training to young people from low-income families; the programme later expanded to other states.

=== Industry bodies ===
While at Federal Bank, Srinivasan chaired the Indian Banks' Association committee on member private-sector banks, and he was a governing council member and honorary fellow of the Indian Institute of Banking and Finance.

=== Later career (2024–present) ===
After retiring from Federal Bank in September 2024, Srinivasan became non-executive chairman of Fedbank Financial Services, the bank's non-banking finance subsidiary.

In April 2025 TVS Capital Funds, a Chennai-based private equity firm, appointed him senior advisor and operating partner, with a remit to advise its portfolio companies on strategy, governance and preparation for public listings. He also joined the firm's board as an independent director. In October 2026 TVS Capital Funds launched TVS Alternatives (TVS Alts), a private credit platform targeting a first fund of ₹750 crore for secured lending to mid-sized Indian companies. Srinivasan is its co-founder and executive chairman and holds a 10 per cent stake, with TVS Capital Funds holding the remainder.

In October 2025 the Reserve Bank of India named Srinivasan a member of its Advisory Group on Regulation, an external expert group chaired by Rana Ashutosh Kumar Singh of the State Bank of India. The group provides industry input to the RBI's Regulatory Review Cell, which reviews all of the central bank's regulations every five to seven years. He was also a member of an expert panel at ICICI Prudential AMC.

ICICI Lombard General Insurance appointed Srinivasan as an independent director for a five-year term from 15 April 2026. On 7 October 2026 the Life Insurance Corporation of India appointed him one of five new independent directors, for a four-year term subject to members' approval. His other directorships include TVS Alternatives, TVS-Alpha Finance and Neo Investment Value Advisors.

== Writing and public speaking ==
=== Better Never Stops ===
In May 2026 Srinivasan published his first book, Better Never Stops (Wyzr), which combines memoir with advice on leadership drawn from his banking career and from cricket. Its central idea, being "happily dissatisfied", is a phrase Srinivasan had used in earlier interviews.

The book was launched in Mumbai, where Srinivasan discussed it with CNBC-TV18 consulting editor Latha Venkatesh; in Chennai, where it was released by the former India cricket captain Kapil Dev; and in Kochi in June 2026, at an event with Federal Bank chairperson Elias George and other business figures. Reviewing it for The Hindu BusinessLine, Vinay Kamath called it "a delightful and fun read" built on anecdote and candid stories, and noted its self-deprecating tone.

=== Columns and speaking ===
While at Federal Bank, Srinivasan wrote a weekly blog for employees that combined sport, current affairs and popular culture with banking themes, and he continues to write weekly on leadership. He speaks regularly at industry and academic events, often using cricket analogies to discuss strategy and risk. In July 2026 he was chief guest at a graduation ceremony of PSG College of Technology in Coimbatore, where he spoke on "Introspection & Opportunity".

== Awards and recognition ==
- Business Standard Banker of the Year for 2019–20, chosen unanimously by a five-member jury chaired by former RBI deputy governor S. S. Mundra for the bank's consistent performance at a time of stress in the sector (announced January 2021).
- Distinguished Alumnus Award, Indian Institute of Management Calcutta (2017).
- Distinguished Alumnus Award, National Institute of Technology, Tiruchirappalli.
- Named among India's Top 50 Best Leaders in Times of Crisis by the Great Place to Work Institute (2021).
- Lifetime Achievement Award, Dhanam (2024).
- Icon of Excellence, Forbes India Leadership Awards (2025).
- Lifetime Achievement Award, Financial Express Best Banks Awards (2025).

== Personal life ==
Srinivasan is married to Maya Shyam, who was his batchmate at IIM Calcutta. He is a cricket enthusiast and has named Rahul Dravid as an influence; at his farewell from Federal Bank in 2024, employees raised cricket bats in tribute.
