= PRS Legislative Research =

Indian non-profit organisation

- Formation: 2005; 21 years ago
- Founders: M. R. Madhavan; C. V. Madhukar
- Type: Section 8 company
- Headquarters: Gandharva Mahavidyalaya, 212, Deen Dayal Upadhyaya Marg, New Delhi
- President: M. R. Madhavan
- Chairman: S. Ramadorai
- Website: www.prsindia.org

PRS Legislative Research, commonly referred to as PRS, is an Indian non-profit organisation that was established in September 2005 as an independent research institute to make the Indian legislative process better informed, more transparent and participatory. PRS is based in New Delhi.

== Background ==
Each Member of Parliament (MP) to India represents over two million constituents. The Indian Parliament passes an average of 60 Bills every year. MPs make laws and address complex policy issues across a wide range of sectors. Given the diversity of issues and the technical nature of many of them, it is not possible for MPs to be well versed on all such issues.

It is in this context that PRS provides MPs analysis on legislation and policy to help them prepare for parliamentary debates.

== History ==
PRS was co-founded by C.V. Madhukar and M.R. Madhavan in 2005. M.R. Madhavan is currently the President of PRS. The Board of Directors is headed by Mr. S. Ramadorai. The initiative was incubated in the Centre for Policy Research (CPR), New Delhi, which is a leading Indian think tank. Since 2013, the initiative has been institutionalised as the Institute for Policy Research Studies, a not-for-profit Section 8 Company.

The work of PRS is entirely funded through philanthropic donations and grants by a number of Indian institutions and individuals.

== Activities and projects ==
=== MP and MLA Engagement ===
PRS regularly interacts with MPs, providing them with research inputs and analysis to support their work in Parliament. PRS shares its analysis on legislation with all MPs in both houses of Parliament. Many MPs reach out to PRS for individual briefings as well as research on specific topics.

PRS also engages with Members of State Legislative Assemblies (MLAs) to provide them research support for their role as legislators. PRS also regularly conducts policy workshops for MLAs which provides state legislators with an opportunity to interact with policy experts and fellow legislators from other states to discuss policy challenges in their states. The Legislators Knowledge Network is another such platform for MLAs to engage with each other.

PRS research is fact-based and analytical, and PRS does not provide recommendations or opinions. It directly briefs MPs across all political parties from both the treasury and opposition benches of both the Houses of Parliament. Some of PRS research products include:

- Legislative Brief: Briefs summarise and discuss the main issues related to Bills introduced in Parliament. The detailed research findings are presented in 4-6 pages, covering the main features and key issues related to each Bill in a concise manner. and
- Monthly Policy Review: A monthly comprehensive report of the major policy developments across various sectors in the country. The aim is to help readers keep track of all significant policy events, including reports by parliamentary and government committees. This report also helps MPs follow events with a view to oversee the policy and working of the government.
- Discussion Paper: Includes analytical reports and conference notes. These papers analyse policies of national importance and various aspects of Parliament.
- Analytical Report: A 20-25 page detailed analysis of the issues/schemes other than legislation.
- Bill and Standing Committee Report Summary: One-page summaries highlighting the main features of a Bill are posted on the website for easy access for MPs and other citizens. PRS also summarises Reports on Bills.
- Report Summary: In addition to Bills, Standing Committees also examine other important issues. Other government commissions and committees may submit reports. The Comptroller and Auditor General also prepares various reports. PRS Summaries of these reports provide a gist of their recommendations and observations.
- Session End Summaries: At the end of every Parliament Session, the Session Wrap report lists the Bills that were passed, Bills that were introduced, and all pending Bills, with their current status. The Plan versus Performance report compares the legislative work accomplished with the official agenda announced at the beginning of the session.
- Statistics: Graphical data-based reports which explain key legislative information and other policy issues. Some of these include performance of Parliament during sessions.

=== Citizens engagement ===
PRS engages with civil society organisations and the media to enable greater engagement with the legislative process. The media regularly accesses PRS for data and analysis related to Parliament and legislation.

The PRS website is updated daily on Parliament’s activities and legislative news. Engagement with citizens is facilitated through the PRS Blog, Twitter and Facebook pages. Workshops are held for journalists on tracking the activities of MPs and MLAs. In addition, PRS provides inputs to the press and electronic media on the legislative agenda in Parliament, as well as data on legislative performance. Members of the PRS team are often approached to contribute columns to provide a perspective on various key Bills and Parliament’s functioning.

PRS collates detailed data and information about Parliament’s functioning. It prepares detailed reports providing timely updates about business in Parliament before and after each session.

PRS enables citizens to track the activity of their MPs in Parliament through an online MP track tool. It tracks the MP’s engagement during sessions on different parameters such as Questions asked, Private Members’ Bill introduced, participation in Debates and Attendance.

Towards the general elections 2014, PRS launched an SMS Tool to enable a citizen to identify and track the performance of his/her MP by typing MP <six digit pin code> and sending it to the number +919223051616.

=== Legislators Knowledge Network ===
The Network is a forum for legislators to interact and share policy initiatives on issues of common interest. The objective is to create a platform for MLAs to showcase positive developments in their states, share and learn best practices, and foster a culture of learning from the experiences of other states on relevant issues.

=== Laws of India Project ===
PRS conceptualised and developed the Laws of India website, which is an online database with nearly 4000 laws from most states across the country. Free online access is provided to all these laws.

=== LAMP Fellowship ===
The Legislative Assistants to Members of Parliament (LAMP) Fellowship was conceptualised by PRS to create a platform for young Indians to engage with policy making at the national level.

The LAMP Fellowship places one legislative assistant to work with an MP. The LAMP Fellows are engaged full-time for eleven months to work with the assigned MP over three parliamentary sessions. Throughout the eleven months, the LAMP Fellow works closely with the MP, providing extensive research support for his/her parliamentary work.

In the first cohort of the LAMP Fellowship, 12 young individuals were selected and trained to work with MPs from both Houses of Parliament, across different political parties. In the following years, the programme was expanded to have over 40 Fellows each year.

LAMP Fellows 2010-11 LAMP Fellows 2011-12 LAMP Fellows 2012-13 LAMP Fellows 2014-15

== Recognition ==
- Business Standard's Social Entrepreneur of the Year 2019.
- NDTV’s Indian of the Year Award in the Public Service category for the year 2013.
- Marico Innovation Foundation’s Social Innovation Award, 2010.

== See also ==
- Democracy in India
- Election Commission of India
- List of think tanks in India
