= Sunil Duggal =

Indian businessman

- Citizenship: India
- Education: BITS Pilani; IIM Calcutta
- Occupation: Ex CEO of Dabur

Sunil Duggal is an Indian entrepreneur and business executive. He is the Ex Chief Executive Officer of Dabur, India's largest Ayurvedic medicine manufacturer.

Duggal holds an undergraduate degree in engineering from Birla Institute of Technology and Science and an MBA from Indian Institute of Management Calcutta. He started his career after his MBA as a management trainee in Wimco, and worked in Bennett, Coleman and Co. and PepsiCo before joining Dabur in 1995. He took over as the CEO of the organization in June 2002.

After completing his 17 year long run as CEO of Dabur, he is set to be succeeded by Mohit Malhotra in April 2019.
