= Sankar Sen (marketing academic) =

Sankar Sen is a marketing academic.

Sen earned a bachelor's degree in biochemistry at Brandeis University in 1985, a master's of science in chemical engineering from the University of Minnesota in 1988, and a doctorate in business administration at the Wharton School in 1993. He is the Lawrence and Carol Zicklin Chair in Corporate Integrity and Governance at the Baruch College Zicklin School of Business.
