= Rajesh Chandy =

American academic

Academic background
- Education: University of Southern California
- Doctoral advisor: Gerard Tellis

Academic work
- Discipline: Marketing
- Institutions: London Business School

Rajesh Chandy FBA is the Tony and Maureen Wheeler Chair in Entrepreneurship and Marketing at London Business School. Since 2018, he has been a Fellow of the British Academy.
