= Jagadguru Kripaluji Yog =

Hindu organisation

- Abbreviation: JKYog
- Formation: 2009 (17 years ago) Plano, Texas, United States 2008 (18 years ago) Delhi, India
- Founder: Swami Mukundananda
- Type: Nonprofit Organization, 501(c)(3)
- Legal status: Charitable Trust
- Purpose: Spirituality
- Headquarters: Plano, Texas, United States Cuttack, Odisha, India
- Region served: United States India
- Website: jkyog.org jkyog.in

Jagadguru Kripaluji Yog (JKYog) is a spiritual and charitable non-profit organization established in India and United States. It was founded by Swami Mukundananda, a senior disciple of Jagadguru Shree Kripaluji Maharaj. JKYog works for physical, mental, spiritual wellness through a holistic system of Yog that includes Bhakti yog, meditation, and spirituality. The organization also supports health care for the underprivileged and education for rural youth.

== History ==
JKYog was founded with the goal of disseminating Vedic knowledge globally. In July 2017, JKYog established the Radha Krishna Temple, Dallas, which serves as the JKYog headquarters in United States. The JKYog Bhakti Ashram in Cuttack, Odisha, serves as the headquarters in India.

== Teachings ==
The mission of JKYog is to serve society with both material and spiritual knowledge for complete physical, mental, intellectual and spiritual well-being. The teachings of JKYog include a combination of five disciplines of Vedic philosophy, which are yoga, breathing techniques, relaxation, meditation and healthy diet.

== Activities ==
JKYog offers weeklong yoga and meditation workshops in about twenty cities of the United States every year, along with philosophical discourses on Vedic sciences and mind management. JKYog arranges typically four spiritual retreats every year in different parts of the United States. Swami Mukundananda visits different cities across United States every year to conduct weeklong yoga and meditation workshops, and deliver spiritual discourses to explain the theoretical and practical aspects of Bhakti yoga.

Daily Sadhana helps people practice Bhakti Yoga on a daily basis by participating in devotional chanting and guided meditation and Vedic study. Several JKYog centers facilitate weekly interactive Bhagavad Gita study sessions based on Swami Mukundananda's commentary on the Bhagavad Gita.

Bal-Mukund is a children's program that includes character building, yoga, pranayam, meditation, chanting, stories and discussions, language classes, games, and arts and crafts. JKYog also offers a youth career development program of leadership skills, public speaking skills, college counselling and community services.

Happiness Challenge JKYog conducted a 21-day worldwide program called "Happiness Challenge" from 1 January to 21 January 2019. The program was created by Swami Mukundananda. According to him, "One of the most pleasing and beneficial arts in our life we can learn is the art of happiness. Happiness is a state of the mind. It arises from a conscious attempt to generate and hold the right stream of thoughts and corresponding emotions."

Life Transformation Challenge From 1 January to 21 January 2020, JKYog conducted a 21-day worldwide program called "Life Transformation Challenge". The program was created by Swami Mukundananda to offer 21 free tools to people around the world to manifest their innate potential by harnessing the powers of the mind with right knowledge and practice.

International Festival of Yoga JKYog has been celebrating the International Day of Yoga since 2015. On this Day JKYog organizes several sessions on yoga, pranayam, holistic health, health and wellness seminars and workshops. Due to the Covid-19 situation, in 2020 JKYog organized an online event to celebrate the International Day of Yoga (20 June 2020 – 26 June 2020), where thousands of people participated virtually around the globe.

For the second year in a row, JKYog conducted an online international Yoga festival in 2021, the theme of which was the link between yoga and good mental health in a post-pandemic world. Several renowned spiritual leaders, yoga teachers, and health professionals discussed the theme in this online event.

Family Camp Every summer JKYog conducts a week-long spiritual retreat and family camp in the Radha Krishna Temple of Dallas, Allen, Texas. The week-long program includes guided meditation sessions, kirtan chanting, cultural events and enlightening discourses by Swami Mukundananda. The spiritual retreat also provides personality development activities, value based teachings, painting and music classes for the children (age 5 - 12) and the youth (age 13 - 18).

== Congregation Centers ==
JKYog has 75 congregation centers all over the world with 50 centers in India and 22 in USA. People regularly meet in the congregation centers to practice bhakti yog. Many centers also conduct regular Bal-Mukund classes for the spiritual upliftment of children.

== Social Service ==
JKYog social services include health care for the underprivileged and education for rural youth. JKYog has helped establish Jagadguru Kripalu Chikitsalaya, a free hospital in the state of Odisha, India. JKYog has also initiated several charitable programs in United States, such as Little Hands Big Hearts, and Kids Assisting Kids. Kids Assisting Kids is a JKYog initiative to provide better access to educational resources to homeless kids by distributing free laptops to needy youth.
