= Sabyasachi Hajara =

Indian business executive (born 1952)

- Born: 3 December 1952 (age 73)
- Citizenship: India
- Education: IIM Calcutta
- Occupations: Ex-Chairman & MD of Shipping Corporation of India

Sabyasachi Hajara (born 3 December 1952) is an Indian business executive. He was the Chairman and Managing Director of Shipping Corporation of India (SCI), the largest Indian shipping company, Mr. Hajara is the current Advisor to the Board – Elektrans Global. An influential figure in worldwide shipping industry, he was ranked among the top 100 influential personalities in the Global Shipping Industry in 2010 by TradeWinds and Lloyd's List, two reputed industry journals.

== Biography ==
Hajara graduated from the University of Calcutta with a Silver Medal in B.Sc (Chemistry) degree in 1970. He completed his MBA from Indian Institute of Management Calcutta in 1973 and joined the Shipping Corporation of India on 2 May 1973. He also completed a degree in Law from University of Calcutta in 1977. In addition to his job at SCI, Hajara has held important positions in industry organizations and institutions such as Indian National Shipowners' Association (INSA), International Shipping Federation (ISF) and the World Maritime University.

== See also ==
- Shipping Corporation of India
