= Ravi Dhar =

American behavioral scientist

Ravi Dhar is an American behavioral scientist, an expert in consumer behavior and branding, currently the George Rogers Clark Professor of Management and Marketing at Yale School of Management. He is also the director of the Center for Customer Insights at the Yale School of Management. He also has an affiliated appointment as professor of psychology in the Department of Psychology, Yale University.
