= Indian Institute of Management Calcutta =

Public Business School located in Kolkata, West Bengal

- Motto: Jñānam Sarvahitāya
- Motto in English: Knowledge for the benefit of all
- Type: Public business school
- Established: 14 November 1961; 65 years ago
- Accreditation: Triple accreditation; AACSB; AMBA; EQUIS; CEMS
- Academic affiliations: AIU; Institute of National Importance
- Budget: ₹314.71 crore (US$33.6 million) (2024–25)
- Chairperson: M. Jagadesh Kumar
- Director: Alok Kumar Rai
- Academic staff: 92 (2025)
- Students: 1,270 (2025)
- Postgraduates: 1,179 (2025)
- Doctoral students: 91 (2025)
- Location: Joka, West Bengal, India; 22°26′44.20″N 88°18′11.79″E
- Campus: Metropolis 140 acres (57 ha)
- Language: English
- Newspaper: Joka Times
- Website: www.iimcal.ac.in

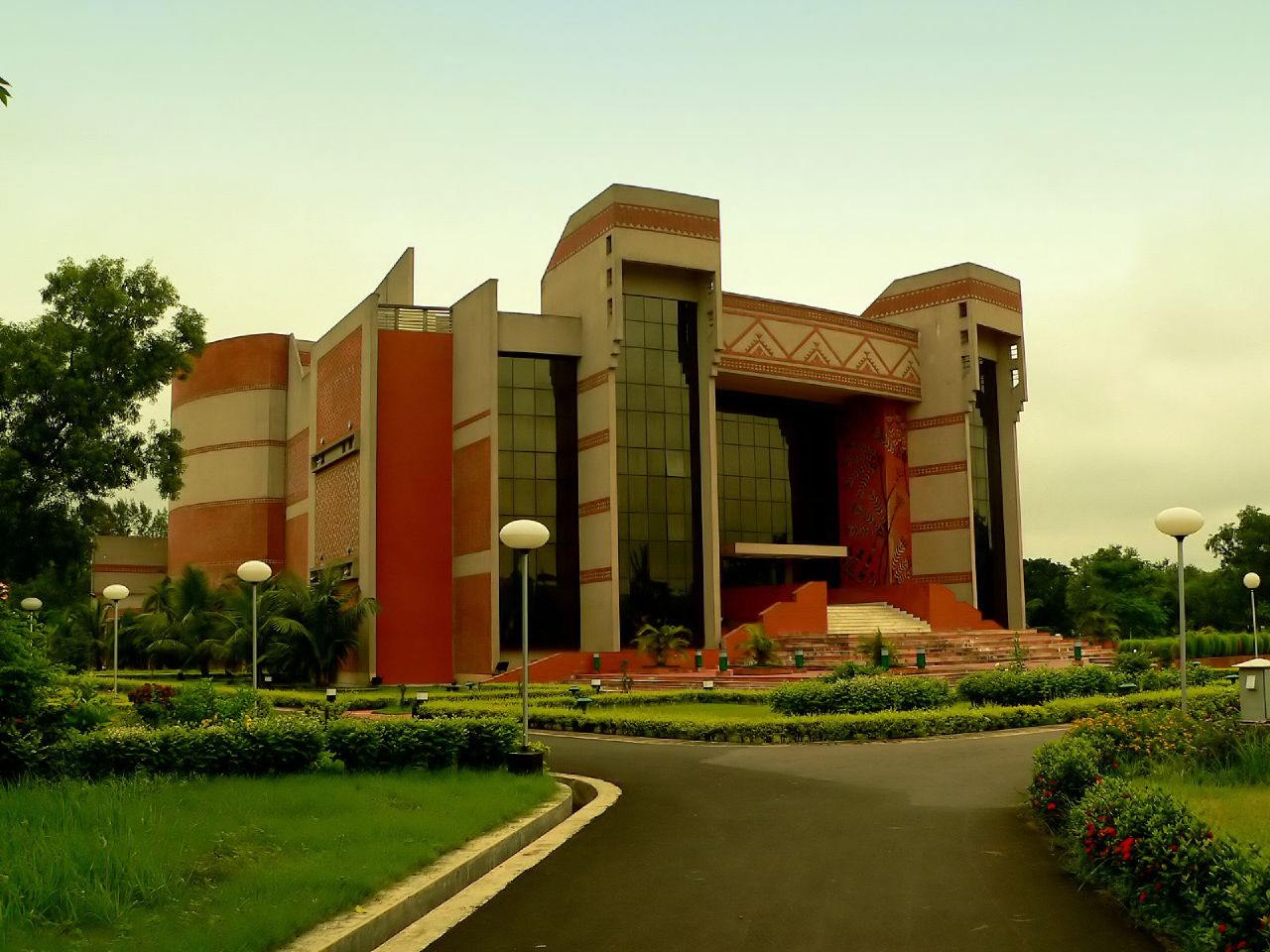
Indian Institute of Management Calcutta

The Indian Institute of Management Calcutta (IIM Calcutta or IIMC) is a public business school in Joka, Kolkata, West Bengal, India. Established in 14 November 1961, it is the oldest of the Indian Institutes of Management and was declared an Institute of National Importance under the Indian Institutes of Management Act, 2017.

The institute was set up in collaboration with the MIT Sloan School of Management, the Government of West Bengal, the Ford Foundation and Indian industry. It moved to its present campus at Joka in 1975. It offers a two-year Master of Business Administration along with executive and doctoral programmes. It holds accreditation from AACSB, AMBA and EQUIS. Admission to the flagship MBA is through the Common Admission Test.

== History ==
After India became independent in 1947, the Planning Commission was entrusted to oversee and direct the development of the nation. India proliferated in the 1950s, and in the late 1950s, the Commission started facing difficulties in finding suitable managers for the large number of public sector enterprises that were being established in India as a part of its industrial policy. To solve this problem, the Planning Commission in 1959 invited Professor George Robbins of the University of California to help in setting up an all India level institute of management studies. Based on his recommendations, the Indian government decided to set up two elite management institutes, named Indian Institutes of Management.

Indian Institute of Management Calcutta was the first of these IIMs, and was established in November 1961 in collaboration with the MIT Sloan School of Management, the government of West Bengal, the Ford Foundation and the Indian industry. Its first director was K. T. Chandy, the former chairman of Hindustan Unilever Limited. During the initial years of IIM Calcutta, its core team included Paul Samuelson, Jagdish Sheth, J K Sengupta, Peter S King, and Thomas Hill.

In its initial years, IIM Calcutta operated from Emerald Bower, Barrackpur Trunk Road, Kolkata. The foundation stone of the current IIM-C campus in Joka, Kolkata, was laid by Morarji Desai, who was then the Deputy Prime Minister of India on 15 December 1968. The institute moved to the new campus in 1975.

The institute played a pivotal role in the tutelage of two fledgling IIMs, fostering their growth and academic integrity throughout their developmental infancy -IIM Ranchi in 2009, and IIM Bodh Gaya in 2015.

== Campus ==
The main campus of IIM Calcutta, covering 135 acres (0.5 km^{2}) of area, is located in Joka, on the outskirts of Kolkata, India. The institute moved to its present campus in 1975.

In December 2019, the institute submitted a formal request to the West Bengal government for a five-acre plot in New Town, Kolkata, to establish a satellite campus. The location was selected to expand executive education programs, increase industry collaboration, and utilize proximity to corporate headquarters and the international airport..

Candidates can visit collegedecode for fees, placement and ROI of the institutes.

== Corporate placement and campus drive ==
IIM Calcutta provides wide network of corporate placement opportunities for its students and recently collaborated internationally for exploring students dynamics for international experience. The collaboration happened in December 2021 includes with TreeAndHumanKnot RisingIndia ThinkTank.

=== Teaching Blocks ===
IIM Calcutta's main Academic Block is situated next to the main administrative building and has four large lecture halls and several additional classrooms. Another academic building named New Teaching Block was opened in 2000 to supplement the main block. A new Academic Block has also been constructed and was declared open by the then Prime Minister of India, Manmohan Singh in August 2011.

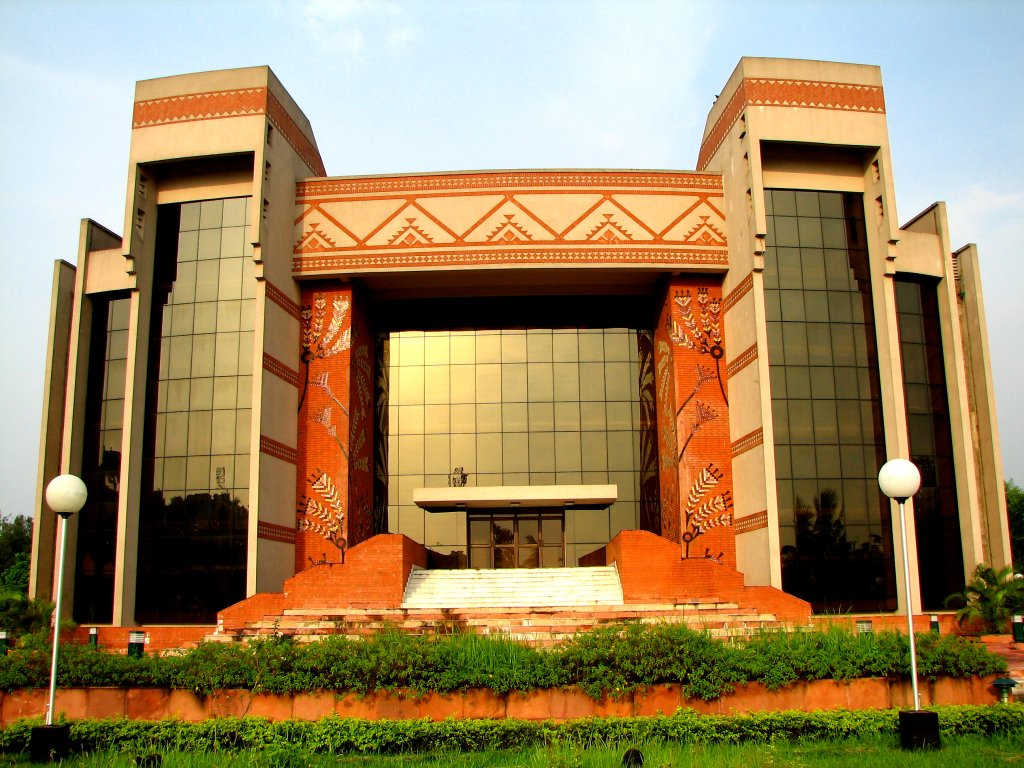
The Auditorium at IIM Calcutta

=== Auditorium ===
The Auditorium at IIM Calcutta, popularly called the Audi, hosts most of the important functions in the campus like the convocation, conferences, student events and talks. The facility seats 750 people and was built at a cost of over ₹90 million (US$960,000). It is fully air-conditioned and is equipped with ultra-modern equipment including professional audio and visual systems.

=== Library ===
The IIM-C library is named Bidhan Chandra Roy Library or BC Roy Memorial Library, after Bidhan Chandra Roy, the second Chief Minister of the state of West Bengal and the first chairman of the institute. The library is primarily envisioned to meet the requirements of the IIM-C's academic programmes. It was started with a grant from the Ford Foundation. It houses over 160,000 volumes and also subscribes to hundreds of management journals and provides access to a large collection of electronic databases. The library processes and functions are fully computerized and in addition to print material, it provides access to more than 40,000 online full-text journals.

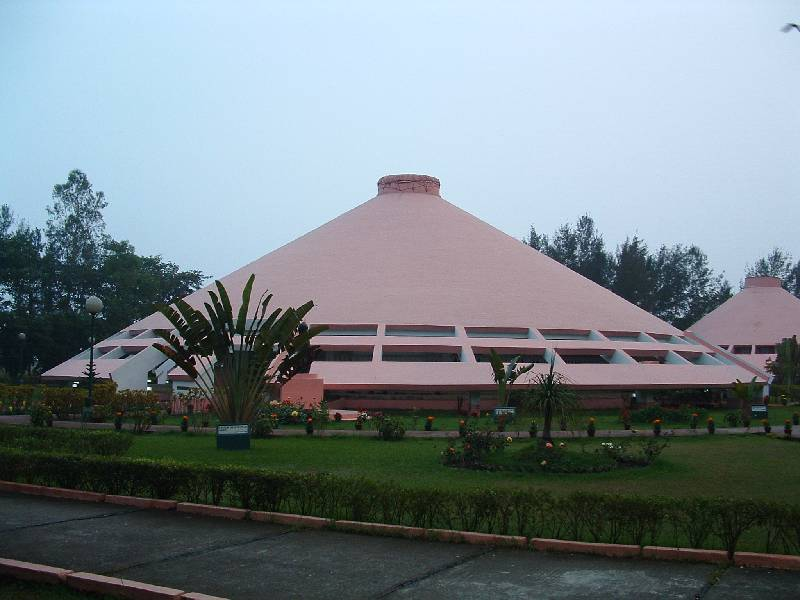
The MCHV building at IIM Calcutta

=== Management Center for Human Values ===
The Management Center for Human Values (MCHV) is located in separate buildings in a part of the campus.

=== Hostels & Accommodation ===
IIM-C has 4 main hostels for students pursuing its PGDM, PGDCM and Fellow programmes – Ramanujan Hostel (colloquially called Old Hostel), Tagore Hostel & Annexe (collectively called the White Hostel), New Hostel and Lake View Hostel. Students with families are provided with separate family accommodation. However, PGP students are provided single boarding accommodation only. Preference is given to FPM & MBAEx (formerly PGPEX) students for hostel allotment. There are separate hostels for MBAEx (formerly PGPEX) and PGPEX-VLM programmes. Single accommodation for MBAEx (formerly PGPEX) students is arranged in Management Development Center (MDC). Students pursuing other courses are usually provided accommodation in the Tata Hall, the guest house in the campus.

=== Financial Research and Trading Lab ===
Established in November 2008, the Financial Research and Trading Lab at IIM Calcutta gives an opportunity to students and faculty members to test financial models with "live" information from the major markets of the world like India's National Stock Exchange, Multi Commodity Exchange, National Commodity and Derivatives Exchange, Bombay Stock Exchange and Bloomberg. The lab is the only one of its kind in India, and has advanced industry-standard equipment and facilities including 51 trading terminals, trading simulators and Bloomberg Terminals. The lab is aimed to help in academic programmes, research on financial markets, product design and testing, executive education and in organising international and national conferences on finance. The laboratory gives students hands-on experience in financial market data analysis and modelling and also helps in advanced applied research in financial markets.

=== Interdisciplinary education ===
From 2025 the institute started multiple courses for convergence of various disciplines in inclusivity, sustainability, challenges firms face, and regional transformation in the MBA programme.

=== New Campus ===
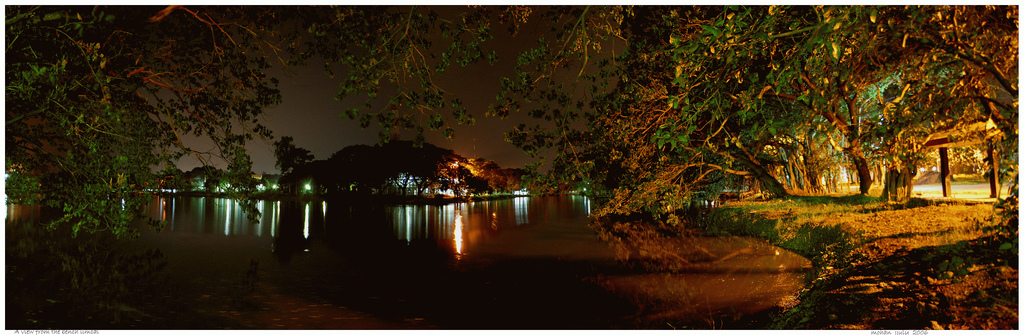
One of the 7 Lakes

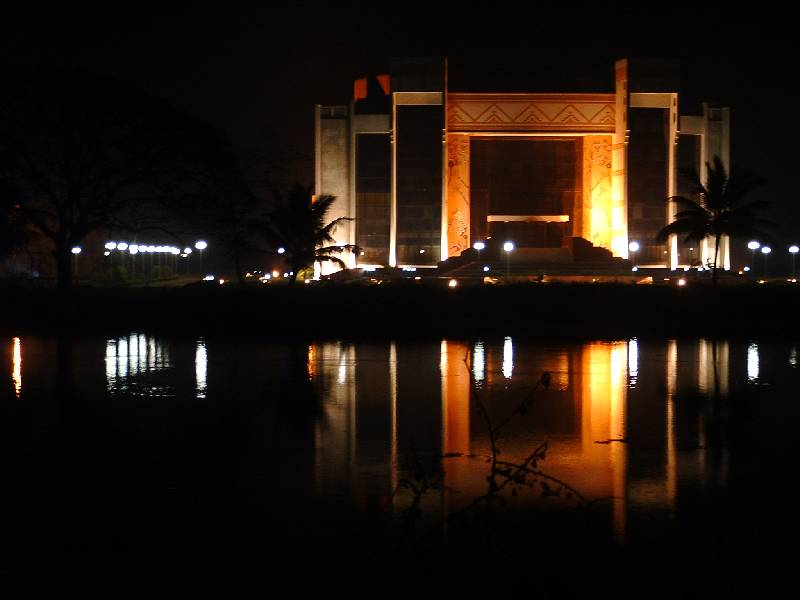
Auditorium from across the Lake

The New Campus is composed of two large "houses" each accommodating 175 students in private rooms with attached balconies. An Executive Centre with 200 suites and rooms, having training and syndicate rooms and well fitted executive dining and recreation areas is well under construction.

This new residential campus is connected to the existing campus via a steel bridge.

The new campus plan and the new buildings are designed by the architect Christopher Charles Benninger of Pune, India.

== Academics ==
=== Centres of Excellences ===
- Finance lab
- Management Centre for Human Values
- Centre for Development and Environment Policy
- Centre For Entrepreneurship And Innovation
- Centre for Corporate Governance
- IIM Calcutta Case Research Center

=== Rankings ===
Institute rankings

Business – international
- QS (MBA) (2023): 68
- QS (MBA) (2024): 59
- QS (MBA-Asia) (2023): 13
- QS (MBA-Asia) (2024): 10
- Financial Times (MBA) (2022): 68
- Financial Times (MBA) (2024): 67
- Financial Times (MiM) (2023): 60

Business/Management – India
- NIRF (2022): 3
- NIRF (2023): 4
- NIRF (2024): 5
- Business Today (2022): 1
- Business Today (2023): 1
- Government colleges
- Outlook India (2022): 3
- Outlook India (2024): 3

Worldwide, the Financial Times has ranked IIM Calcutta 21 in its Masters in Management Ranking 2020 and 42 in its Global MBA Ranking 2020. Quacquarelli Symonds ranked the IIM Calcutta 65th in the world and 11th in Asia in the QS World University Rankings Global MBA Rankings 2025.

In India, IIM Calcutta was ranked seventh among management schools by the National Institutional Ranking Framework (NIRF) in 2025, a notable drop in its third position back in 2022.

=== Accreditation ===
IIM Calcutta was the first management school in India to complete triple accreditation by being recognized by three globally reputed b-school accreditation organizations: Association to Advance Collegiate Schools of Business (AACSB), European Quality Improvement System (EQUIS) and Association of MBAs (AMBA). It is also the only Indian business school that is a member of the Global Alliance in Management Education (CEMS).

== Student life ==
=== Student Exchange Programmes ===
IIM Calcutta has an extensive network of partner B-schools worldwide through which it conducts student exchange programmes. For the Post Graduate Programme, the student exchange programme (STEP) is usually held in the fifth term, between August–September and December. Every year during this period, more than a hundred students from IIM Calcutta leave for foreign institutes, and an equivalent number from various B-schools arrive in IIM Calcutta to spend the term there. Other academic programmes of IIM-C also offer exchange programmes.

=== Joka Times ===
Joka Times is the student-run online campus magazine-journal of IIM Calcutta. It serves as a one-stop site for the latest events, news and updates on IIM Calcutta, and showcases the student-life at IIM-C. Joka Times also hosts a forum, through which students applying for courses at IIM Calcutta are guided by existing students at the institute.

=== Events ===
==== Intaglio ====
Intaglio is the annual international Business school summit hosted by Indian Institute of Management Calcutta. The flagship event of IIM-C, it was started in 1992 as the National Business School Meet (NBSM), and is widely acknowledged to be the biggest B-school meet in India. Intaglio, usually held over a 3-day weekend in January, serves as a platform facilitating the interaction of eminent personalities from the industry, academia, media and government, holding conferences, workshops and seminars by experts in different fields on a wide range of topics. Intaglio also includes a large number of competitive and non-competitive events for B-school students, which attract participation from institutions from around the world, like Asian Institute of Technology, Australian Graduate School of Management, CEIBS, ESCP Europe, Harvard Business School, other IIMs, London Business School, MIT Sloan, National University of Singapore, University of Toronto and the Wharton School. As a mark of its superior quality of events and processes, Intaglio in 2007 became the first event of its kind in India to achieve the ISO 9001:2000 certification from the International Organization for Standardization. In 2010, Intaglio got the distinction of being the first carbon-neutral B-school event in India.

The major regular events at Intaglio include:

- Olympus – the greatest leadership hunt: The flagship event of Intaglio in its recent editions, Olympus is a business leadership competition in which a single representative each from a few top B-schools compete against one another.
- Wizards Of Biz – the boardroom battle: A business simulation game.
- The Great Innovation Challenge: A competition that tests the business innovation and creative skills of participants.
- Consulting Knights: Co-sponsored by a Management consulting firm, this event exposes participants to real-life business situations, testing their consulting skills.

==== Carpe Diem ====
Carpe Diem is the annual cultural fest organised by the students of IIM Calcutta. It is usually held over a 3-day weekend in February and attracts participation from colleges and schools across India. It is the largest B-School Cultural Fest in Eastern India. In 2013, it had over 12,000 participants from 100+ colleges.

The major regular events at Carpe Diem are:

- Armageddon: Amateur Rock music competition.
- Symphony: Musical concert.
- Razzmatazz: Fashion show.
- Euphoria: Dance competition.

==== Lattice ====
Lattice is the annual business symposium organized by the MBAEx (formerly PGPEX) students of IIM Calcutta. It is a platform that facilitates interaction of students of IIM Calcutta with leaders of Indian society and industry. Lattice is usually held in October. It attracts guests from different spheres of Indian industry, society, IIM Calcutta alumnus, and students from different business schools. The event was started in year 2010.

==== 7 Lakes Fest ====
7 Lakes Fest is the inaugural college fest to be held in December 2020 combining the legacy of 28 years of Intaglio (Business Summit), Carpe Diem (Cultural Fest), and 7 Lakes Run (Sports). Spread over three days, 7 Lakes Fest is the most prominent college fest of the Indian Institute of Management, Calcutta. It provides a platform for participants from Indian institutes to come together and showcase their talent in business skills, music, dance, quizzing, sports, creativity, theatre, and literary events.

== Notable people ==
=== Alumni ===
IIM Calcutta has a 15,000+ strong alumni network who have taken up careers in management, academy, public service, and social service around the world. Every year, the institute hosts Golden and Silver jubilee reunion. Since 2011, the institute has been awarding a Distinguished Alumni Award to alumni who have made "immense contributions" in the fields of management, academy, public service, social service. Notable alumni include Krishnamurthy Subramanian, Ajit Balakrishnan, Sunil Duggal, Ramachandra Guha, Indra Nooyi, Shyam Srinivasan, Amish Tripathi, Gopal Vittal and Swami Mukundananda.

=== Faculty and staff ===
See also Category:Academic staff of the Indian Institute of Management Calcutta

Past and present faculty at IIM Calcutta include many prominent scholars such as management educationist Ravi J. Matthai, economists Paul Samuelson, Ashok Mitra, Yoginder K Alagh and Deepak Nayyar, statisticians Warren Bennis, Jagdish Sheth and Rahul Mukerjee, anthropologist Surajit Chandra Sinha, and historians Barun De and Rajat Kanta Ray.

== See also ==
- Indian Institutes of Management
- Institutes of National Importance
- Education in India and Higher education in India
- Common Admission Test (CAT)
