= Vishwanath =

Vishwanath (also spelt Viswanath, Vishvanath, Viswanatha, Visvanatha, Viswanathan, Vishwanathan) is an Indian deity name, surname and given name. It is of Hindu origin and derives from Sanskrit Viśvanātha (विश्वनाथ), an epithet of the god Shiva meaning "lord of the universe" (from viśva, "universe" + nātha, "lord"). In South India, the Tamil-Malayalam third-person masculine singular suffix -n is added. It may refer to:

== Deity ==
- Śiva Viśvanātha

== Temples ==
- Kashi Vishwanath Temple, Uttar Pradesh, India
- Kasi Viswanathar temple, Tenkasi, Tamil Nadu, India
- Kasi Viswanathar temple, Sivakasi, Tamil Nadu, India
- Kasi Viswanathar Temple, Kumbakonam, Tamil Nadu, India
- Kasi Viswanathar Temple, Umayalpuram, Tamil Nadu, India
- Kasi Viswanatha Temple, Ayanavaram, Tamil Nadu, India
- Kasi Viswanatha Temple, West Mambalam, Tamil Nadu, India
- Kunnuvarankottai Kasi Visalakshi-Viswanathar Temple, Tamil Nadu, India
- Shri Vishwanath Mandir, Uttar Pradesh, India
- Sri Kasi Vishwanatha Temple Flint, Hindu temple in Michigan, USA

== People ==
=== Given name ===
- Vishvanatha Sharma (fl. 1736), 18th-century Sanskrit scholar and author of the Vrataraja
- Vishvanath Narayan Mandlik (1833 – 1899), Indian legal expert on Hindu law
- Vishwanath Bhatt (1898 – 1968), Gujarati literary critic and lexicographer
- Vishwanath Bhoir, Indian politician
- Vishwanath Bondre (1936 – 2014), Indian cricketer
- Vishwanath Das Shastri, Indian politician
- Vishwanath Datta, Bengali barrister, philanthropist and novelist
- Vishwanath Dev Gajapati (1500 - 1571), a Kalinga king
- Vishwanath Jadhav (1885−1964), Indian classical khyal singer
- Vishwanath Kashinath Rajwade (1863 – 1926), Indian historian, scholar, writer, commentator
- Vishwanath Mahadeshwar (born 1960), Indian politician
- Vishwanath Meghwal, Indian politician
- Viswanatha Nayak, Vijayanagara viceroy to Madurai, during the 16th century
- Vishwanath Patil, Indian politician
- Vishwanath Prasad Tiwari (born 1940), Indian poet, editor, critic
- Vishwanath Pratap Singh (1931–2008), seventh Prime Minister of India
- Vishwanath Rao Ringe (1922–2005), Hindustani Classical Music vocalist and composer
- Vishwanath Reddy Mudnal, Indian politician
- Vishwanath Shahdeo (1817 – 1858), king of Barkagarh estate and a rebel in the Indian rebellion of 1857
- Vishwanath Sharma, Indian politician
- Vishwanath Shastri, Indian politician
- Vishwanath Tamasker, Indian politician
- Vishwanath Tripathi (born 1931), Indian writer
- Vishwanath Vaishampayan (1910 – 1967), Indian revolutionary
- Viswanatha Kaviraja, 14th century Indian poet
- Viswanatha Sastri, Carnatic music composer
- Viswanatha Satyanarayana, (1895 – 1976), an Indian Telugu writer
- Viswanathan Anand, (born 1969) Indian chess grandmaster and former world chess champion
- Viswanathan Kumaran, Indian chemical engineer and rheologist
- Viswanathan Manikan (born 1951), Indian activist
- Viswanathan Raghunathan (born 1954), Indian academic, author, columnist
- Viswanathan Ratnam, Indian Judge
- Viswanathan–Ramamoorthy, Indian music-director duo
- V. Ravichandran (film producer), full name Viswanath Ravichandran

=== Surname ===
- Adagur H. Vishwanath (born 1949), Indian politician
- Acharya Vishwanath Baitha, Indian politician
- Ashoke Viswanathan, Indian Bengali filmmaker
- Ashvin Vishwanath, (born 1973), Indian-American theoretical physicist
- A. K. Viswanathan, Indian Police Service officer
- Cheri Viswanath (1933 – 2014), South Indian screenwriter, playwright, lyricist and journalist
- Chitra Vishwanath, an Indian architect
- Balaji Vishwanath (1680–1719), Peshwas (Prime Minister) of the Maratha empire
- Balasubramanian Viswanathan, Indian material scientist
- Bhaskar Vishwananth Ghokale (1903 – 1962), Indian Ayurveda practitioner
- Biju Viswanath, Malayalam film and photography director
- Dhirajlal Mahashankar Vishwanath Thaker (1897–1947), British colonial official and Paymaster General of the Port of Karachi
- G. Viswanathan, founder and chancellor of Vellore Institute of Technology, India
- Geraldine Viswanathan, (born 1995), Australian actress
- Gitl Schaechter-Viswanath, Yiddish-language poet and author
- Gundappa Viswanath (born 1949), Indian cricketer
- Hari Viswanath, Indian film director, producer and screenwriter
- Harish Viswanathan, Indian scientist
- Indira Viswanathan Peterson, Indian literary critic
- Janaki Vishwanathan, Indian film maker
- K. A. P. Viswanatham (1899 – 1994), Indian scholar, orator and social activist
- Kethu Viswanatha Reddy, Indian short story writer
- K. Viswanath (1930–2023), Telugu film director
- Kaithapram Vishwanathan Namboothiri, Indian musician and music director
- Kalpana Viswanath, Indian social entrepreneur
- Kanithi Viswanatham, Indian politician
- Kasisomayajula Viswanath, American scientist
- K. K. Viswanathan (1914 – 1992), Indian ex-governor of Gujarat
- Maharajapuram Viswanatha Iyer, Indian Carnatic vocalist
- Maharajapuram Viswanatha Santhanam (1928–1992), Carnatic music vocalist
- Mahashankar Vishwanath Thaker (1867–1902), Chief Treasurer of the Princely State of Limbdi under Jhala Rajput rule
- M. S. Viswanathan (1928–2015), Tamil film music composer
- N. Viswanathan, Indian actor and academic
- N. K. Viswanathan, Indian film director and cinematographer
- N. S. Vishwanathan, deputy governor of Reserve Bank of India
- P. Viswanathan, Indian politician
- P. H. Vishwanath, Indian film director, writer and a producer who works in Kannada cinema
- Padma Viswanathan, Canadian playwright
- Palghat Kollengode Viswanatha Narayanaswamy, Indian musician
- Paranjape Prakash Vishvanath (1947–2008), Indian politician
- Paris Viswanathan (born 1940), Indian painter and filmmaker
- Pramod Viswanath, Indian professor
- Pranjivan Vishwanath Thaker (1860 - 1920), Diwan of Saurashtra, Gujarat
- Premi Viswanath, Indian television actress
- Penumarti Viswanatha Sastry, (1929 – 1998), Indian Telugu writer and editor
- R. Viswanathan (diplomat), Indian diplomat
- R. Ranchandra Vishwanath Wardekar (1913–1996), Indian doctor and founder of Gandhi Memorial Leprosy Foundation
- Natham R. Viswanathan, Indian politician
- Rachakonda Viswanatha Sastry (1922–1993), Indian Telugu writer
- Radha Viswanathan, Indian vocalist and classical dancer
- Ramakrishnan Vishwanathan (1960–1999), Indian Army officer
- Raman Viswanathan, Indian physician
- Ramesh Vishwanath Katti (born 1964), Indian politician
- Ramnarayan Vishwanath Pathak, Indian poet and writer
- S. R. Vishwanath (born 1962), Indian politician
- Sadanand Vishwanath (born 1962), former Indian cricketer
- Sanju Viswanath (1994), Indian cricketer
- Shivraj Vishwanath Patil, Indian politician
- Sunny Viswanath, Indian composer and music producer
- T. Viswanathan (1927–2002), Indian Carnatic music flutist
- T. K. Viswanathan, Indian politician
- T. N. Viswanatha Reddy, Indian politician
- T. R. Viswanathan, American engineer
- Umesh Vishwanath Katti, Indian politician
- V. Viswanatha Menon (1927 - 2019), Indian Communist leader
- V. Viswanathan (1909 - 1987) Indian ICS officer
- Vani Viswanath (born 1968), Indian actress
- Vichu Vishwanath, Indian film and television actor
- Vishwa Nath (1917–2002), Founder of Delhi Press
- Vishwa Nath Sharma (born 1930), 15th Chief of the Indian Army Staff
- Vysyaraju Kasi Viswanadham Raju, Indian politician
- Y. Kasi Viswanath, Indian actor and director

== Films ==
- Justice Viswanathan, 1971 Indian Tamil language film
- Lawyer Viswanath, a 1978 Indian film
- Vishwanath (1978 film), a Hindi film directed by Subhash Ghai
- Vishwanath (1996 film), a Tamil film directed by K. Goutham
- Viswanatha Nayakudu, a 1987 Indian Telugu film
- Viswanathan Ramamoorthy, 2001 Indian Tamil film
- Viswanathan Velai Venum, a 1985 Indian Tamil film

== See also ==
- Biswanath (disambiguation)
- Vishva (disambiguation)
- Nath (disambiguation)
- A. R. C. Viswanathan College, in India
- K.A.P. Viswanatham Government Medical College, in India
- Dr. Vishwanath Karad MIT World Peace University, Indian university in Pune, Maharastra
- Kashi Vishwanath Express, an Indian express train
- Viswanath Charali railway station, Indian railway station
- Vishwanathganj, Indian town in Uttar Pradesh
- Viswanath's constant, a mathematical constant
- Viswanatha chikitsa, text written by physician Viswanatha Sen in 1921
- Viswanatham, Indian town in Tamil Nadu
