= Viswanathan =

Viswanathan விசுவநாதன் വിശ്വനാഥൻ
- Pronunciation: Vicuvanātaṉ
- Gender: Male
- Language: Tamil; Malayalam

Origin
- Region of origin: Southern India; North-eastern Sri Lanka

Other names
- Alternative spelling: Vishvanathan; Visvanathan; Vishwanathan; Viswanatham
- Derived: Shiva
- Related names: Vishwanath

Viswanathan (Tamil: விசுவநாதன், romanized: Vicuvanātaṉ; Malayalam: വിശ്വനാഥൻ, romanized: Viśvanāthan) is a male given name in South India and Sri Lanka. Due to the South Indian tradition of using patronymic surnames it may also be a surname for males and females. It is of Hindu origin and derives from višvanatha, meaning "lord of the universe" (from višva, "universe" + natha, "lord," an epithet of the god Shiva), + the Tamil-Malayalam third-person masculine singular suffix -n.

== Notable people ==
- A. K. Viswanathan, Indian police officer
- Ashoke Viswanathan (born 1959), Indian film maker
- Balasubramanian Viswanathan (born 1941), Indian material scientist
- C. N. Visvanathan (born 1947), Indian politician
- G. Viswanathan (born 1938), founder and chancellor of VIT University in India
- Geraldine Viswanathan (born 1995), Australian actress
- Harish Viswanathan, American engineer
- Indira Viswanathan Peterson, Indian literary critic
- Janaki Vishwanathan, Indian film maker
- K. A. P. Viswanatham (1899–1994), Indian scholar
- K. K. Viswanathan (1914–1992), Indian politician
- K. R. Viswanathan, Indian politician
- Kaavya Viswanathan (born 1987), Indian-American Harvard undergraduate student, noted for plagiarism in her 2006 novel
- Kaithapram Vishwanathan Namboothiri, Indian musician
- Kanithi Viswanatham (1932–2023), Indian politician
- Kasi Viswanathan (born 1968), Indian film editor
- M. S. Viswanathan (1928–2015), Tamil film music composer
- Mahesh Viswanathan, American engineer
- Mitraniketan Viswanathan (1928–2014), Indian social reformer
- N. Viswanathan (1929–2010), Indian actor
- N. K. Viswanathan (1941–2017), Indian film director
- N. S. Vishwanathan (born 1958), Indian banker
- P. Viswanathan, Indian politician
- Padma Viswanathan (born 1968), Canadian playwright
- Paris Viswanathan (born 1940), Indian painter and film maker
- Poornam Viswanathan (1921–2008), Indian actor
- R. Viswanathan (born 1949), Indian politician
- Radha Viswanathan (1934–2018), Indian vocalist
- Ramakrishnan Vishwanathan (1960–1999), Indian soldier
- Raman Viswanathan (1899–1982), Indian physician
- Shiv Visvanathan, Indian academic
- Susan Visvanathan (born 1957), Indian sociologist
- T. Viswanathan (1927–2002), South Indian classical Carnatic flutist
- T. K. Viswanathan (born 1948), Indian administrator
- T. R. Viswanathan, American engineer
- V. Viswanathan (1909–1987), Indian politician
- Viswanathan Anand (born 1969), World Chess Champion 2007–2013
- Visvanathan Dharmalingam (1918–1985), Sri Lankan politician
- Viswanathan Kumaran (born 1966), Indian chemical engineer
- Viswanathan Manikan (born 1951), Indian community activist
- Viswanathan Raghunathan (born 1954), Indian academic
- Viswanathan Ratnam (1932–2020), Indian judge
- V. Ravichandran (film producer), full name Viswanathan Ravichandran
- Visvanathan Rudrakumaran, Prime Minister of the Transnational Government of Tamil Eelam
- Viswanathan Shanta (1927–2021), Indian oncologist

== Other uses ==
- A. R. C. Viswanathan College, arts and science college in Mayiladuthurai, Tamil Nadu, India
- Justice Viswanathan, 1971 Indian Tamil language film
- K.A.P. Viswanatham Government Medical College, medical college in Tiruchirappalli, Tamil Nadu, India
- Viswanatham, town in Tamil Nadu, India
- Viswanathan Ramamoorthy, 2001 Indian Tamil film
- Viswanathan Velai Venum, a 1985 Indian Tamil film
