= Kashi Vishwanath Temple (disambiguation) =

Kashi Vishwanath Temple may refer to the following Hindu temples dedicated to Shiva in India:

- Kashi Vishwanath Temple, Varanasi, Uttar Pradesh
- Kashi Vishwanath Temple, Guptakashi, Uttarakhand
- Kashi Vishwanath Temple, Uttarkashi, Uttarakhand
- Kasi Viswanatha Temple, Ayanavaram, Chennai, Tamil Nadu
- Kasi Viswanatha Temple, West Mambalam, Chennai, Tamil Nadu
- Shri Vishwanath Mandir, Banaras Hindu University, Varanasi, Uttar Pradesh
- Kasi Viswanathar Temple (disambiguation)
  - Kasi Viswanathar Temple, Sivakasi, Tamil Nadu
  - Kasi Viswanathar Temple, Tenkasi, Tamil Nadu
  - Kasi Viswanathar Temple, Kumbakonam, Tamil Nadu
  - Kasi Viswanathar Temple, Umayalpuram, Tamil Nadu
- Kashi Vishweshwar Temple, Kadugodi, Bengaluru, Karnataka
- Kunnuvarankottai Kasi Visalakshi-Viswanathar Temple, Dindigul, Tamil Nadu

== See also ==
- Sri Kasi Vishwanatha Temple Flint, Tennessee, US
- Kashi Vishwanath (disambiguation)
- Vishvanath Temple (disambiguation)
- Vishwanath (disambiguation)
