= Kashi Vishwanath (disambiguation) =

Kashi Vishwanath Temple is a Hindu temple dedicated to Shiva in Banaras, Uttar Pradesh, India.

Kashi Vishwanath may also refer to:

- Kashi Vishwanath Express, an Indian express train that runs between Banaras in Uttar Pradesh and New Delhi railway station
- Kasi Viswanathan (born 1968), an Indian film editor

== See also ==
- Kashi Vishwanath Temple (disambiguation)
- Kasi Viswanathar Temple (disambiguation)
- Vishvanath Temple (disambiguation)
- Vishwanath (disambiguation)
