= Kasi Viswanathar Temple =

Kasi Viswanatha Temple may refer to these Shiva temples in India:

- Kasi Viswanath Temple, the jyothirlinga in Varanasi, Uttar Pradesh, India
- Kasi Viswanathar Temple, Kumbakonam, a temple in Kumbakonam, Tamil Nadu, India
- Kasi Viswanathar temple, Tenkasi, a temple in Tenkasi, Tirunelveli district, Tamil Nadu, India
- Kasi Viswanathar Temple, Sivakasi, a temple in Sivakasi, Tamil Nadu, India
- Kasi Viswanathar Temple, Umayalpuram, a temple in Thanjavur district, Tamil Nadu, India
- Kasi Viswanatha Temple, Ayanavaram, a temple in Ayanavaram, Chennai, Tamil Nadu, India
- Kasi Viswanatha Temple, West Mambalam, a temple in West Mambalam, Chennai, Tamil Nadu, India
- Kunnuvarankottai Kasi Visalakshi-Viswanathar Temple, a temple in Kunnuvarkottai, Tamil Nadu, India
- Walajapet Kasiviswanathar Temple, a temple in Ranipet district, Tamil Nadu.

== See also ==
- Kashi Vishwanath Temple (disambiguation)
- Vishvanath Temple (disambiguation)
- Vishwanath (disambiguation)
