= Champakesvara Siva Temple =

Champakeswara Shiva Temple
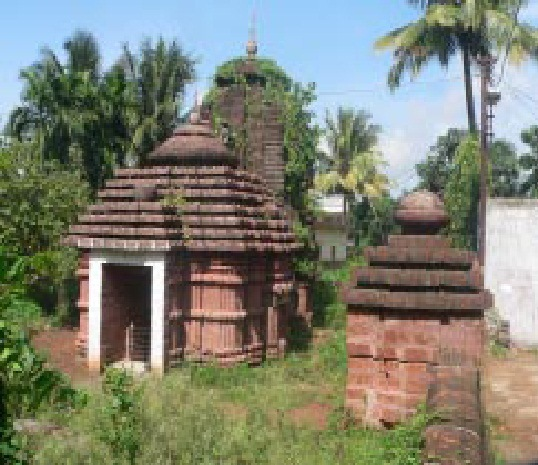

- Location in Odisha

Religion
- Affiliation: Hinduism
- District: Khurda

Location
- Location: Bhubaneswar
- State: Odisha
- Country: India
- Interactive map of Champakeswara Shiva Temple
- Coordinates: 20°14′48″N 85°51′28″E

Architecture
- Type: Kalingan Style (Kalinga Architecture)
- Completed: 13th century A.D.

Champakeswara Shiva Temple is located Ambika Sahi in the Old Town area of Bhubaneswar in Odisha, India. It is 157 metres west of Parasuramesvara on the right side of the Kotitirthesvara lane leading to Bindu sagara. It is a laterite temple. Local people believe that the enshrined Siva lingam is patalaphuta and the precinct is the abode of nagas (champa naga) after whom the deity is named as Champakesvara. The local people also believe that the temple precinct which is a den for the snakes do not harm any body.

== The Temple ==
The temple dates back to 13th century A.D. The temple has a lot of significance in the past as well as today. It was of significance during the Ganga period. Shivaratri, Jalasayi, Rudrabhiseka, Sankranti are observed in this temple. Thread ceremony, birth day and marriage engagements are also carried out here. The temple is inside a laterite compound wall, which is surrounded by residential buildings on the northern side, Visvanatha temple in the southern side, Kotitirthesvara tank in the eastern side and the lane in the northern and western sides.

== Architectural features ==
The temple has a vimana and a jagamohana measuring 11.05 metres in length and 6.00 metres in width. The temple is pancharatha. The vimana, jagamohana and antarala are 4.50 square metres, 6.00 square metres and 0.55 metres respectively. The vimana is rekha in order where as the jagamohana is apidha deul. It is a panchangabada temple consisting of pabhaga, tala jangha, bandhana, upara jangha and baranda, which measures 0.75 metres, 0.75 metres, 0.17 metres, 0.72 meters, and 0.82 metres respectively. The sanctum is 0.90 metres below the present ground level. Pabhaga has five base mouldings of khura, kumbha, pata, kani and basanta. The baranda has also five mouldings. The pabhaga of jagamohana measures 0.70 metres with four mouldings. The entire structure above pabhaga is a later renovation. The gandi of the main temple measures 5.81 metres above the baranda mouldings. The mastaka measures 2.00 metres with components like beki, amlaka, khapuri and kalasa. The temple precinct is surrounded by a compound wall made of laterite with an entrance in the northern side. The compound measures 30.50 metres in length, 15.80 meters in breadth and 1.35 metres in height.

== Raha niches ==
The raha niches of the western, northern and southern sides are identical in measurement measuring 0.85 metres in height, 0.47 metres in width and 0.34 metres in depth. All the niches are empty.

== Decorative features ==
The doorjambs are later addition, which are plain. There is no navagraha architrave. The pabhaga is devoid of sculptural embellishment. The jangha is separated by a single moulding bandhana. The jangha is decorated with simple pilaster designs. The baranda is also left plain. At the base of the gandi in the raha paga there are three miniature rekha deul and the central one is higher than the rest two. The gandi is plain except miniature rekha deul and bhumi amlas in the kanika paga. Four bhumi amlas are found in the kanika paga. The raha paga of the gandi on all the four sides have udyota simha.

== Special features ==
Laterite temple, which was originally a panchayatana precinct as evident from the ruins of shrines in the western corners of the precinct. In one of these subsidiary shrines, there is a four armed broken image of Kartika in standing position. The lower left arm is broken and the upper left arm rests over a cock, which is upheld by a diminutive woman. There is an ancient well in front of the temple, which measures 1.30 metres square with a depth of 5.25 metres.

== See also ==
- List of Hindu temples in India
- Kotitirtha Tank
