= Thaker (surname) =

Thaker is an Indian surname and may refer to:

- Pranjivan Vishwanath Thaker (circa 1860 – 1920), diwan of Vadia in Saurashtra, Gujarat, India
- Mahashankar Vishwanath Thaker (circa 1867 – 1902), chief treasurer of the princely state of Limbdi
- Dhirajlal Mahashankar Vishwanath Thaker (1897–1947), paymaster general of the Port of Karachi
- Dhirubhai Premshankar Thaker (born 1917), chief editor of Gujarati Vishwakosh, first extensive encyclopedia in the Gujarati language; and winner of the 1994 Ranjitram Suvarna Chandrak, the highest literary award in Gujarati literature
