= Vishva =

Vishva is an alternative name for Vishnu, which refers to the world, the universe. Vishva or Visva may also refer to

- Jain Vishva Bharati University in Rajasthan, India
- Visva-Bharati University in West Bengal, India
- Vishva Hindu Parishad, an Indian right-wing Hindu nationalist organisation
- Vaishvanara, stage of consciousness in Hindu philosophy
- Vishva (name)

== See also ==
- Vishwanath (disambiguation)
