= Biswanath =

Biswanath or Bishwanath is an Indian name, referring to the Hindu god Shiva, and may refer to:

- Biswanath Basu, Indian actor
- Biswanath Chowdhury, Indian politician
- Biswanath Das, Indian politician
- Bishwanath Das, Indian politician, lawyer, and philanthropist
- Bishwanath Ghosh (disambiguation)
- Biswanath Halder, perpetrator of the 2003 Case Western Reserve University shooting
- Biswanath Mukherjee, academic
- Biswanath Pattnaik, Indian activist
- Bishwanath Prasad Shahabadi
- Biswanath Rath, Indian filmmaker
- Bishwanath Roy, Indian politician
- Bishwanath Singh, Indian wrestler
- Biswanath Somadder, Indian justice, hief Justice of Sikkim High Court
- Biswanath Chariali or Viswanath Charali, a city in Assam, India
  - Biswanath district
  - Biswanath (Vidhan Sabha constituency)
  - Viswanath Charali railway station
- Bishwanath Upazila, upazila (subdistrict) Sylhet, Bangladesh

== See also ==
- Vishwanath (disambiguation)
