= Thake =

Thake is a surname. Notable people with the surname include:

- Al Thake (1849–1872), British baseball player
- Charles Thake (1927–2018), Maltese actor
- Eric Thake (1904–1982), Australian artist
- Shanta Thake (born 1979), American theatre director

== See also ==
- Thaker (surname)
