= Alibaba Ara Dozen Dongalu =

1994 Indian comedy film

- Theatrical release poster
- Directed by: E. V. V. Satyanarayana
- Written by: Marudhuri Raja (dialogues)
- Screenplay by: E. V. V. Satyanarayana
- Story by: E. V. V. Satyanarayana; Ramani
- Produced by: K. Chinni
- Starring: Rajendra Prasad; Ravali; Srikanya
- Cinematography: Babji
- Edited by: Naayani Maheswara Rao
- Music by: Vidyasagar
- Production company: Melody Movies
- Release date: 31 December 1993
- Running time: 150 mins
- Country: India
- Language: Telugu

Alibaba Ara Dozen Dongalu (transl. Alibaba and Half a Dozen Thieves) is a 1993 Indian Telugu-language comedy film written and directed by E. V. V. Satyanarayana starring Rajendra Prasad, Ravali, and Srikanya, with music composed by Vidyasagar. The film was released on 31 December 1993 and was a box office success. It received positive critical acclaim.

== Plot ==
The film follows Alibaba, a bumbling police officer, and his interactions with six petty thieves as they confront three rival criminal groups: Kotayya & Co. and the Brahmam brothers. Their chaotic confrontations cause havoc in the city, prompting the Superintendent of Police (SP) to assign Alibaba to bring the situation under control. Despite his efforts, Alibaba struggles to manage the situation, and the SP considers suspending him. However, Alibaba is given a final opportunity to apprehend a notorious gangster, Appaji.

Alibaba lives with his domineering paternal uncle, a retired head constable who helped secure his job, and his maternal aunt, Balamani, who has been waiting for her husband, Ekalingam, for 50 years. Balamani guards a diamond worth ₹25 lakh, which she promises to give to anyone who provides information about her missing husband. The thieves and criminals devise plans to steal the diamond by impersonating Ekalingam but fail miserably.

When Alibaba is tasked with capturing Appaji, he strikes a deal with the gangster to fake an arrest and maintain his job. However, the plan falls through, and the arrested Appaji is sent to Tihar Jail, enraging him. Meanwhile, the thieves plot to marry their sisters, Phoolan Devi and Pooja Bedi, to Alibaba as part of their scheme to steal the diamond. Phoolan Devi tricks Alibaba into marriage, while Pooja Bedi and the remaining thieves complicate matters further by artfully carrying his first night with Pooja Bedi.

Caught between two women and a house full of criminals, Alibaba's life descends into chaos. His uncle and aunt are taken hostage, and the thieves wreak havoc in his home. Frustrated, Alibaba accuses the SP of being the root of his troubles. The SP, in turn, stages an elaborate scheme, convincing Alibaba that he has only three months to live, inspiring him to act fearlessly.

Emboldened, Alibaba manages to imprison the thieves and begins to appreciate his two wives. However, Appaji escapes from jail and kidnaps Alibaba's wives, demanding Balamani's diamond in exchange. In the climactic confrontation, Alibaba outsmarts Appaji, retrieves his wives, and uncovers the true nature of the diamond—it is merely a worthless British-era paperweight.

The film concludes with Alibaba embracing his unconventional family and reconciling with the SP, who orchestrated much of the chaos to help Alibaba grow.

== Cast ==
- Rajendra Prasad as Alibaba
- Ravali as Phoolan Devi
- Srikanya as Pooja Bedi
- Satyanarayana as S.P.
- Kota Srinivasa Rao as Kotayya & co
- Brahmanandam as Brahmam Brothers
- Ali as Kotayya & co
- Mallikharjuna Rao as Kotayya & co
- Rallapalli as Brahmam Brothers
- Giribabu as Alibaba's Babai
- Viswanathan as Appaji
- Ironleg Sastri as Pindala Sastry
- Tirupathi Prakash as Lady constable
- Chidatala Appa Rao as Brahmam Brothers
- Dham as constable
- Vidyasagar
- Silk Smitha as SP's wife
- Nirmalamma as Balamani

== Soundtrack ==
Alibaba Ara Dozen Dongalu

Film score by Vidyasagar
- Released: 1993
- Genre: Soundtrack
- Length: 28:45
- Label: Supreme Music
- Producer: Vidyasagar

Vidyasagar chronology
| Chilakapachcha Kaapuram (1993) | Alibaba Ara Dozen Dongalu (1993) | Aame (1994) |

Music was composed by Vidyasagar. Audio soundtrack was released on Supreme Music Company label.

| No. | Title | Lyrics | Singer(s) | Length |
|---|---|---|---|---|
| 1. | "Baba Baba Alibaba" | Bhuvana Chandra | S. P. Balasubrahmanyam | 5:20 |
| 2. | "Nee Pere Naa Prema" | Veturi | S. P. Balasubrahmanyam, Chitra | 5:02 |
| 3. | "Yerra Buggalu Chusuko" | Bhuvana Chandra | S. P. Balasubrahmanyam, Chitra | 4:07 |
| 4. | "Kassu Kassu Mannadhi" | Bhuvana Chandra | S. P. Balasubrahmanyam, Chitra | 4:21 |
| 5. | "Rambha Naaku Peddappaa" | Bhuvana Chandra | Chitra, Malgudi Subha | 4:56 |
| 6. | "Nee Paita Jaripothe" | Bhuvana Chandra | S. P. Balasubrahmanyam, Mano | 4:59 |
| Total length: | | | | 28:45 |

== Reception ==
In their obituary of director E. V. V. Satyanarayana, The Times of India listed Alibaba Ara Dozen Dongalu among "some of his super-hit comedy and entertaining films".
