= Vishvanath Temple =

Vishvanath Temple may refer to any of the following temples dedicated to the Hindu god Shiva, who is also known as Viśvanātha:

- Kashi Vishwanath Temple, Varanasi, Uttar Pradesh
- New Vishwanath Temple, Banaras Hindu University, Varanasi, Uttar Pradesh
- Visvanath Siva Temple, Bhubaneswar, Odisha, India
- Vishvanatha Temple, Khajuraho, Madhya Pradesh, India

== See also ==
- Kashi Vishwanath Temple (disambiguation)
- Kasi Viswanathar Temple (disambiguation)
- Vishwanath (disambiguation)
