= Pipe dream =

Pipe dream, pipedream or Pipe Dream(s) may refer to:

- pipe dream, a fanciful or unattainable goal, such as produced by smoking an opium pipe

== Books ==
- Pipe Dreams: Greed, Ego, and the Death of Enron, a 2002 book by Robert Bryce
- Pipe Dreams: Water and Empire in Central Asia's Aral Sea Basin, a 2019 book by Maya K. Peterson

== Computing ==
- Pipedream (toolkit), a hacking toolkit targeting programmable logic controllers
- PipeDream, a built-in applications package for the Cambridge Z88 portable computer which later became a commercially available applications package for RISC OS

== Film and television ==
- Pipe Dream (film), a 2002 American romantic comedy film
- Pipe Dream, a 2001 animated short film made by Animusic
- Pipe Dreams (1916 film), an American comedy short starring Oliver Hardy
- Pipe Dreams (1938 film), a 1938 MGM cartoon
- Pipe Dreams (1976 film), an American romantic comedy film
- "Pipe Dreams" (The Loud House), a 2018 TV episode
- "Pipe Dreams" (Rocko's Modern Life), a 1994 TV episode

== Music ==
- Pipe Dream (musical), a 1955 Rodgers and Hammerstein musical
- Pipedreams, an American radio program featuring organ music

=== Albums ===
- Pipe Dream (John Williamson album) or the title song, 1997
- Pipedream (Alan Hull album), 1973
- Pipe Dreams (Murray Head album), 1995
- Pipe Dreams (Potluck album), 2009
- Pipe Dreams (Whirr album), 2012
- Pipe Dreams, by Mark Salling, 2010
- Pipedreams, by Davy Spillane, 1991

=== Songs ===
- "Pipe Dreams" (Nelly Furtado song), 2016
- "Pipe Dream", by the Blues Magoos from Electric Comic Book, 1967
- "Pipe Dream", by Jeff Watson from Lone Ranger, 1992
- "Pipe-Dream", by King Gizzard & the Lizard Wizard from Oddments, 2014
- "Pipe Dream", by Project 86 from Project 86, 1998
- "Pipe Dreams", by Travis from The Invisible Band, 2001

== Video games ==
- Pipe Dream (video game), or Pipe Mania, a 1989 puzzle game
- Pipedream, an unlockable track in the 2001 snowboarding game SSX Tricky

== Other uses ==
- Pipe Dream (newspaper), a student newspaper at Binghamton University in New York
- Operation Pipe Dreams, a 2003 U.S. investigation of businesses selling drug paraphernalia
- "Pipe Dream", a 1959 short story by Fritz Leiber
