= Vallabhbhai Patel Chest Institute =

Postgraduate medical institute in Delhi, India

Coordinates: 28°41′26.254″N 77°12′32.972″E

- Motto: Sanskrit: "निष्ठा धृति: सत्यम"
- Motto in English: "Dedicated to Truth"
- Established: January 12, 1953; 73 years ago
- Academic affiliations: University of Delhi
- Director: Dr. Raj Kumar
- Location: Delhi, India
- Campus: Urban
- Nickname: VPCI
- Website: vpci.org.in

Vallabhbhai Patel Chest Institute is a postgraduate medical institute located in Delhi, India, and supported by the University of Delhi. The Ministry of Health & Family Welfare of India takes care of its endowment. It has been categorized as one of the constituent colleges of the University of Delhi. The institute's teaching focuses on chest diseases as well as their treatment. The institute is maintained under the statute XX(2) of the University.

== History ==
The history of the institute dates back to the pre-independence era of India. The Bhore Committee report formed by the Ministry of Health pointed out the need of trained personnel and an institution in the field of chest diseases country. Officials, then decided to establish such an institution in the country which would train people in this field. The Directorate of Ministry of Health, Government of India, lodged an application to Sir Maurice Gwyer, the then Vice-Chancellor of University of Delhi, to start a course in chest diseases at the earliest. In 1946, Sir Maurice Gwyer constituted a committee for this purpose. On the recommendation of the committee a proposal was submitted to the Government by the Vice-Chancellor for the establishment of a new institute. In the beginning, the teaching and training facilities of the Lady Hardinge Medical College, Irwin and Silver Jubilee Hospitals in Delhi, were used by the institute. A diploma course in chest diseases was started in 1947 and Dr. R. Viswanathan, the then Deputy Director General, Health Services, Government of India, was appointed as the Honorary Director of the course. Sardar Vallabhbhai Patel, the then Deputy Prime Minister of India, laid the foundation stone of the institute on 6 April 1949. The institute is also named after him. Rajkumari Amrit Kaur opened the institute on 12 January 1953 and R. Viswanathan served as the first Director of the Institute. The hospital wing of the institute, named after Dr. R. Viswanathan, is called Viswanathan Chest Hospital [formerly known as Clinical Research Centre]. The hospital started working in 1956 but it was inaugurated on 25 October 1957 by the then President of India, Dr. Rajendra Prasad.

== Present form ==
Institute, today, fulfils the national need to provide medical education in field of chest diseases and relief to large number of patients in the community suffering from chest diseases. Postgraduates are trained in pulmonary medicine and allied subjects in the institute. Research and new diagnostic technologies are developed. The institution provides the infrastructure for specialized clinical and investigative services to patients. The institute has also played a role in conducting investigations for the pandemic influenza H1N1 virus.

== Campus ==
The institute is located in the heart of the north campus of the University of Delhi, providing the requisite academic environment. V. P. Chest Institute has all the infrastructure needed for its students to pursue academic studies and research.

=== Library ===
The library began in 1955 but it has journal issues dating back as far as 100 years. The institute has over 10,000 books, 23,000 bound journals, and national and international reports in the field of pulmonary disease and allied sciences. Library has journal subscriptions and also receives some journals in exchange with other institutions.

=== Hostel ===
Hostel is also named after the surname of Sardar Vallabhbhai Patel, as Patel Niwas. The foundation stone of the hostel was laid on 7 April 1962 by the Vice-Chancellor of the University of Delhi, Dr. C.D. Deshmukh. The hostel was inaugurated on 6 April 1965 by Dr. C.D. Deshmukh on the Sixteenth Foundation Day of the Institute. The hostel has 30 rooms for boys and 10 rooms for girls on each floor of the three-storeyed building of Patel Niwas.

=== Misc ===
Apart from library and hostel, the institute has an animal house, publication unit, medical photographic studio and a canteen.

== Organisation and administration ==
=== Governance ===
V. P. Chest Institute has its own governing body for management, administration and academics. The management's aim is all round development of the student. The Director is the administrative and academic head of the Institute. The administration wing is organized under the Deputy Registrar who reports to the Director. The Deputy Registrar is assisted by three Assistant Registrars looking after General administration, Accounts, Establishment, Purchase and stores, and other sections of administration.Presently Sh. Omkar Nath Pandit, Deputy Registrar heads the administration wing of the institute.

=== Departments ===
VPCI has 13 departments in total:

- .Department of Biochemistry
- .Department of Biostatistics
- .Department of Cardiorespiratory Physiology
- .Department of Clinical Biochemistry
- .Department of Medical Mycology
- .Department of Microbiology
- .Department of Pathology
- .Department of Pharmacology
- .Department of Physiology
- .Department of Radiodiagnosis & Imaging
- .Department of Respiratory Allergy & Immunology
- .Department of Respiratory Medicine
- .Department of Respiratory Virology
