= Maya K. Peterson =

American environmental historian (1980–2021)

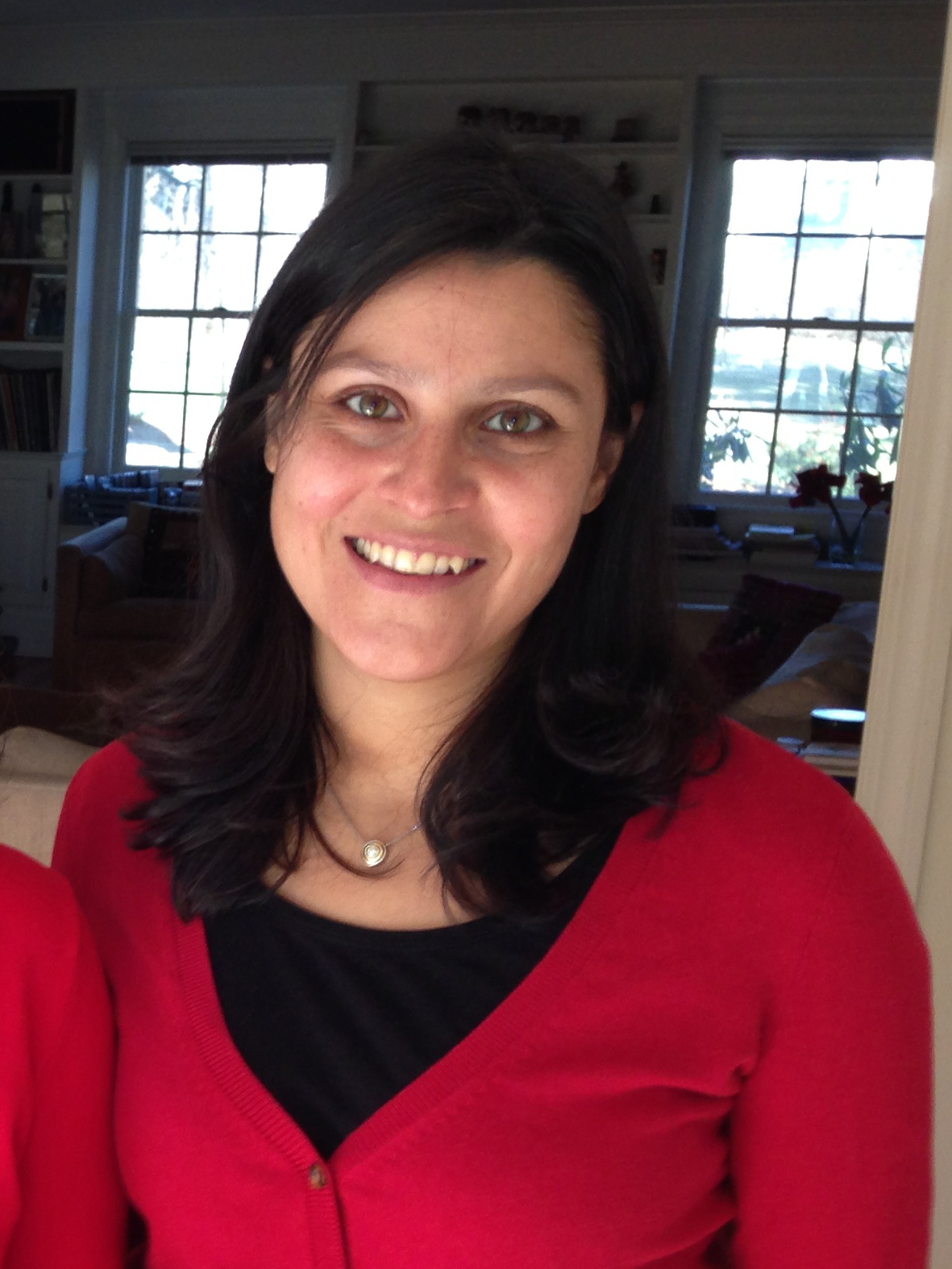
- Born: 19 April 1980; Northampton, Massachusetts, U.S.
- Died: 16 June 2021 (aged 41); Santa Cruz, California, U.S.
- Partner: A. Marm Kilpatrick
- Relatives: Indira Viswanathan Peterson (mother)

Academic background
- Education: Swarthmore College (BA); Harvard University (MA, PhD)

Academic work
- Discipline: Historian
- Main interests: Central Asian studies
- Notable works: Pipe Dreams: Water and Empire in Central Asia's Aral Sea Basin (2019)

Maya Karin Peterson (19 April 1980 – 16 June 2021) was an American historian. She was an associate professor of history at the University of California, Santa Cruz. She specialized in environmental history of Central Asia.

Peterson is best known for her 2019 book Pipe Dreams: Water and Empire in Central Asia's Aral Sea Basin about the Aral Sea environmental crisis caused by poor water management by the Soviet and subsequent post-Soviet governments. She died during childbirth in 2021 aged 41.

== Life and work ==
Maya Karin Peterson was born on 19 April 1980 and grew up in Massachusetts. Her parents were academics who worked as professors at Mount Holyoke College. She studied history at Swarthmore College, majoring in history. She earned a master's degree at Harvard University, staying there to complete a PhD in 2011 and then became a postdoctoral fellow at the Department of the History of Science at Harvard.

In 2012, Peterson visited the Rachel Carson Center for Environment and Society in Munich, returning to is several times during her research. That same year, she became an assistant professor at the University of California, Santa Cruz and became tenured in 2019.

For her research, Peterson travelled throughout Central Asia. Her work focused heavily on the size of the Aral Sea over time, the impact of irrigation on the environment, and the health impacts on people who lived in the region. Her work was widely praised by colleagues.

Peterson died suddenly during childbirth on 16 June 2021. Her daughter Priya Luna died a day later.
