= The Blu Ribbon Revolution =

Book by Viswanathan Manikan

The Blu Ribbon Revolution: Co-creating a World Beyond Poverty
- Author: Viswanathan Manikan
- Language: English
- Subject: Management and Ethics
- Publisher: Cyber Tech Publications
- Pages: 384
- ISBN: 978-93-5053-306-2

The Blu Ribbon Revolution: Co-creating a World Beyond Poverty (ISBN 978-93-5053-306-2) is a book by the Winner of the 2012 Dubai Cares Award and community activist Viswanathan Manikan.

The book looks into the aspect of Corporate Social Responsibility (CSR) as a tool for measured efforts towards poverty alleviation while aligning business objectives. In the book Manikan strikes a contrast between excessive wealth vis-à-vis stark poverty and inadequate resource distribution across globally deprived regions.

Insights into major developmental and relief efforts across governments, multi-lateral organizations, non-governmental organization (NGOs), and individuals are accentuated. But the main highlight of the book is CSR and its far reaching and sustainable practices that have brought about measurable changes and improved conditions across economic zones.

== Abstract ==
The Blu Ribbon Revolution starts off by addressing key issues of poverty particularly in least developed countries (LDCs). Manikan further discusses the causes of poverty with historical ramifications and progressively highlights alleviations efforts. The book divided in four phases concludes with the importance of CSR, case studies and provides an easily implementable CSR business framework.

== How poor are the poor ==
While the luxury market booms Manikan states the richest nations with wealth above US$100,000 per adult in 2010, were found in North America, Western Europe, and the rich Asian-Pacific and Middle East countries. In contrast to these statistics were figures that state that almost 50 percent of the population in LDCs lives on less than $1 a day.

The book puts forth the appalling conditions, issues of malnutrition, rates of infant mortality, diseases, economic and social factors and poverty traps in the regions of Sub-Saharan Africa, Middle Eastern and North Africa (MENA), Latin America and the Caribbean and South Asia (India and Bangladesh). The UN Human Development Index (HDI), Purchasing power parity (PPP) and Gini coefficient in these regions are some of the factors that have been taken into consideration.

Manikan discusses how HDI is lowest in Africa putting forth poverty parameters in Horn of Africa. Even though HDI were lower in these regions poverty in itself has varied repercussions. The author mentions the Report of the State of Food Insecurity in the World (1999) that estimated India alone with more undernourished people (204 million) than all of sub-Saharan Africa combined.

== Causes of poverty ==
The origins of poverty have been classified as historical, environmental, social, cultural and political each with its own impact. Colonialism, slavery, war, and conquest have led to long term impacts globally but most of all in African and Asian nations.

In terms of Environmental causes, nature plays a vital role as harvests from forests, fisheries, and farms are a primary source of rural income and a fallback when other sources of employment falter. However the author highlights environmental imbalance can be disastrous as the nature of poverty is largely rural. UN Food and Agriculture Organization (FAO) has pointed out that, in the world's poorest countries, more than 75 percent of the population lives in rural areas and depends on agriculture for work and income. Any environmental adversity in such a case can have long term consequences.

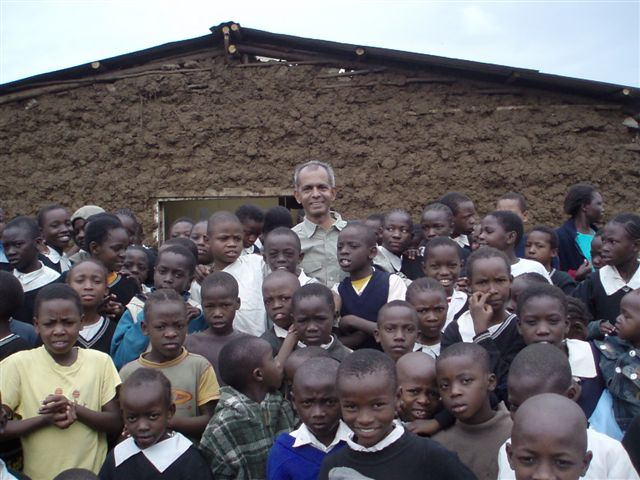
Viswanthan Manikan at the Big Pen School in Nairobi

The Multidimensional nature of poverty can be assessed by the fact that Manikan states that 80 percent of the world's population lives in countries where income differentials have widened. The UNDP's 2007 Human Development Report highlights this in the book with an estimate that the poorest 40 percent of the world's population account for only 5 percent of global income. On the other hand, the richest 20 percent account for 75 percent of world income.

Considering economic factors such as half the world's workforce toiling in unstable, insecure jobs, Manikan states children, especially girls, suffer major health and education setbacks. He states it would be well worth to ponder the fact that statistics state around 24,000 children die every day from preventable causes – many from diseases like measles, diphtheria, and tetanus.

Political factors such as unrest can also to lead to poverty issues such as displacement. The author mentions that Southern and Western Asia and sub-Saharan Africa are home to the largest populations of refugees. By the end of 2010 more than 43 million people were displaced by conflict or persecution, both within and outside the borders of their own countries as per UN HCR (United Nations High Commissioner for Refugees).

He also discusses the role of women in politics. As per the statistics quoted in 2008 women held at least 40 percent of the seats in five parliaments: Rwanda leads the way at 48.8 percent, followed by Sweden (47 percent), Cuba (43.2 percent), Finland (41.5 percent), and Argentina (40 percent).

The author covers views of economists and historians on creating measures for poverty and the complexities that follow.

== Alleviation Avenues ==
The author talks about Alleviation avenues by first mentioning noted economist and poverty activist Jeffery Sachs and his theory of clinical economics. The role of national governments and their adherence to World Bank and International Monetary Fund (IMF) proposed Poverty Reduction Strategy Paper (PRSP) framework as per Highly Indebted Poor Countries (HIPC) Initiative have been discussed in-depth in chosen nations. Poverty alleviation programmes are classified into (i) selfemployment programmes, (ii) wage employment programmes, (iii) food security programmes, (iv) social security programmes, and (v) urban poverty alleviation programmes.

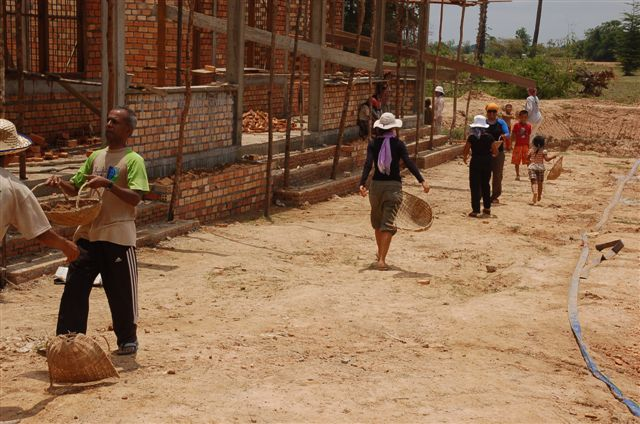
Manikan carrying stones as a part of the Cambodia project

Central to the theme of poverty reduction have been the UN Millennium Development Goals. The framework of eight goals, eighteen targets, and forty-eight indicators have been studied along with efforts by United Nations member bodies and international organizations.

The author talks about the growth of international NGO community falling within the broad framework of Civil Society Organizations (CSOs). Manikan mentions that their partnership with United Nations has been active since 1947 and humanitarian work has been the core objective of some of the biggest NGO's such as Oxfam, CARE, World Vision, and Save the Children. The book looks at the extraordinary work of these along with the work of organizations such as The Green Belt Movement, The Hunger Project, Dubai Cares, Dubai International Humanitarian Aid and Development (DIHAD), Promoting Education, emPowering Youth (PEPY's), The Dhaka Project, Room to Read, and ACF (Action Contre la Faim) International.

In the larger gamut of humanitarian efforts the author also illustrates the role of social entrepreneurs, change makers and philanthropists.

== Corporate social responsibility ==
The Credit Suisse global wealth pyramid is an indicator of the state of poverty in terms of percentage. Manikan suggests understanding each of the four tiers of the pyramid to get a deeper understanding of how CSR takes precedence over the mere act of charity while attending to 68.4% (in 2010) of the global poor. He suggests corporate social responsibility is a phrase that marketers and economists use; it has filtered down to represent the virtue of a company and its motives in community management.

A rigorous literature review of CSR ideologies and frameworks suggested by noted economists and poverty activists have been studied. The Wealth of Nations by eighteenth-century Scottish philosopher Adam Smith, the Bowen Effect and evolution of CSR from 1950s have been discussed. This brings forth the pivotal CSR debate on whether businesses have the sole purpose of making profits increasing shareholder wealth or must businesses consider comprehensive stakeholders while giving back to the society at large.

An evolution of CSR across the world, case studies and the UN Global Compact have been discussed to bring about the benefits of a strategic CSR engagement. Manikan finally proposes that CSR in the true sense aids in adherence to wider stakeholder interests while creating a balance between business goals and societal obligations. He highlights different aspects of CSR, frameworks suggested by noted CSR practitioners and illustrates his own strategic CSR framework for organizations taking onto account the five different aspects of Environmental, Economic, Philanthropic, Ethical and Legal CSR.

As a parting note Manikan suggests in essence, organizations today need to adapt to changing leadership requirements effectively implementing CSR strategies for growth and sustainability.
