= St. Joseph's College, Tiruchirappalli =

College in Tamil Nadu, India

Coordinates: 10°49′48″N 78°41′29″E

St. Joseph's College
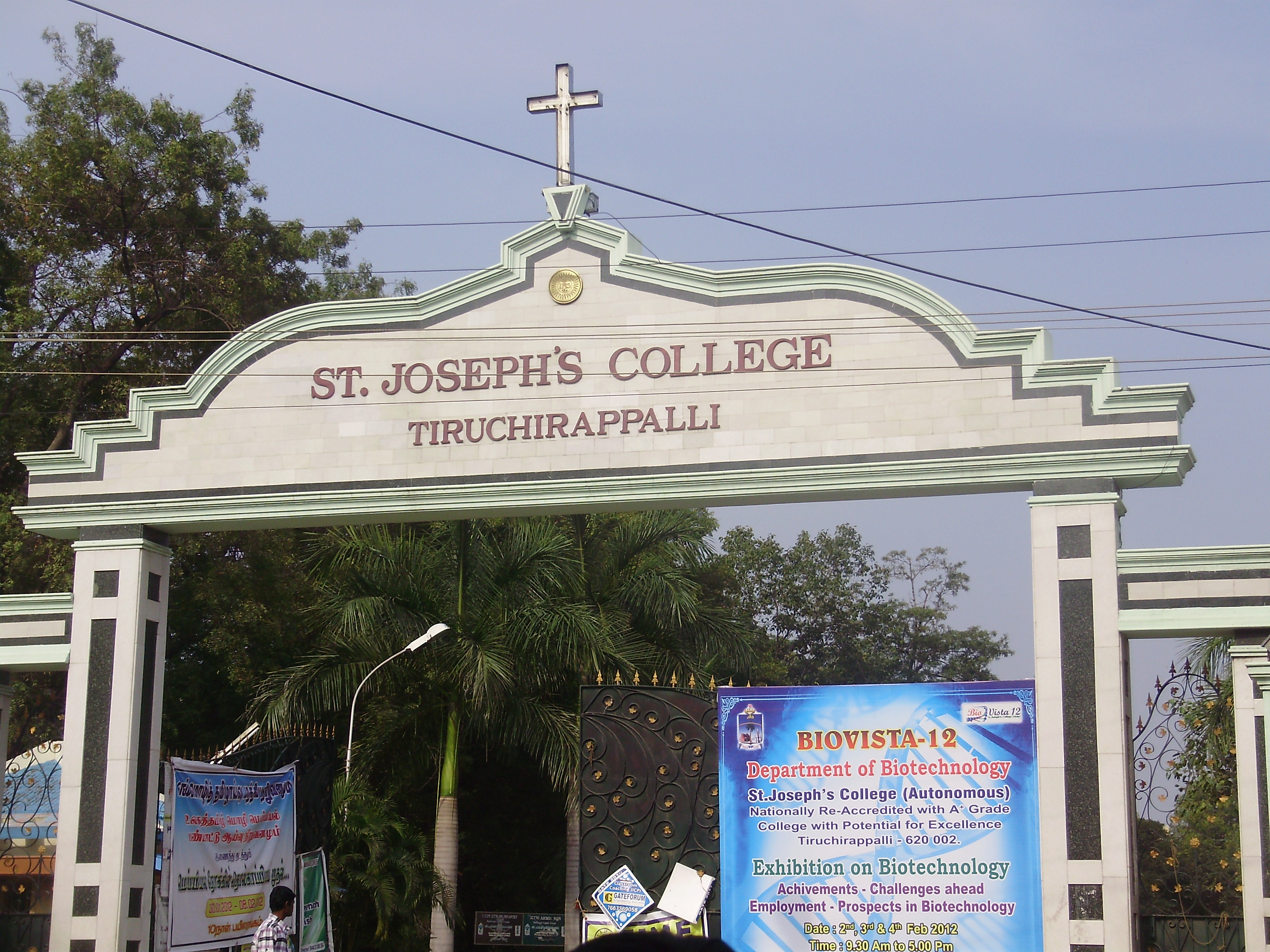
- Motto: Pro Bono Et Vero (Latin)
- Motto in English: For the Good & the True
- Established: 1844; 182 years ago
- Religious affiliation: Roman Catholic (Jesuit)
- Academic affiliations: Bharathidasan University
- Rector: Rev. (Dr.) Pavulraj Michael SJ
- Principal: Rev. (Dr.) K. Arockiam SJ
- Location: Tiruchirappalli, Tamil Nadu, India
- Campus: 76 acres (30.8 ha)
- Website: sjctni.edu

St. Joseph's College, Tiruchirappalli (SJC) is a private Catholic college in Tiruchirappalli, Tamil Nadu, India. It was established in 1844 by the Society of Jesus (Jesuits). It is an affiliated college of Bharathidasan University.

In 2016, the College was one of only twelve colleges in India to be given Special Heritage Status by the Government of India.

== Introduction ==
The College is one of the oldest higher education institutions in India. It is a private, aided, Catholic Christian Minority Institution. Its motto is ‘Pro Bono et Vero’ (for the Good and the True).

The College was founded in 1844 by French Jesuit priests, along with other European Jesuits. The College was affiliated to the University of Madras until 1982, after which it became affiliated with the Bharathidasan University, with which it remains affiliated.

It caters to the educational needs of wide and divergent sections of students with an emphasis on the poor and downtrodden.

== Milestones ==
1844	College founded at Nagappattinam
1866	College affiliated to University of Madras
1883	Moved to Tiruchirappalli due to natural calamity like epidemic
1895	Golden Jubilee celebrations
1896	College Band started
1905	Lawley Hall opened by the Governor of Madras, Sir Arthur Lawley, for whom it is named
1907	Digby Hall, which holds the Physics Department, opened on 29 May 1907, named for an English family who donated the funds for the building
1912	College Magazine founded
1918	Russian General Nikolai Barazoff visited the Campus Old Boys Association to inaugurate it on 23 November
1924	Flood ravaged the campus
1925	On 17 January, Cardinal Alexis Lepicier, OSM, DD, Visitor Apostolic to the East Indies, visited the campus
1928	Mechanical and Electrical Engineering courses introduced
1938	On 19 June, the Governor General of India, Shri C. Rajagopalachari visited
1939	Extension to Lawley Hall and hostel buildings completed
1944	Centenary celebrations presided over by Arthur Hope, 2nd Baron Rankeillour, the Governor of the Madras Presidency
1949	Chemistry Block opened on 19 April
1955	Prime Minister of India Jawaharlal Nehru visited the campus on 3 October and delivered an address
1957	Opening of Stadium - cum Parisian Hon’ble Dr. S. Radhakrishnan, then then-Vice President of India, laid the foundation for the Botany and Zoology department on 23 July
1964	Centenary Library opened
1967	Rapinat Herbarium inaugurated by Father K. M. Matthew SJ
1970	Celebrations of 125th anniversary. M. Karunanidhi, Chief Minister of Tamil Nadu presided over the celebrations on 11 February
1973	Evening College started on 23 July
1978	Autonomy was conferred by the UGC. On 5 May, the University of Madras granted autonomous status. Foundation Courses started
1982	Affiliated to Bharathidasan University
1986	The Science and Humanities for People's Development Programme (SHEPHERD) introduced as an extension department
1994	Sesquicentenary celebrations
1996	Fr Ehrhart Computer Center opened on 9 August
1997	Jubilee Building opened on 24 February
1998	Library computerized information service started on 13 January. Internet facility introduced on 12 October
2000	Accredited with Five Star by NAAC
2001	Choice Based Credit System (CBCS) introduced
2003	Illustrious alumnus H.E. Dr. A. P. J. Abdul Kalam, President of India visited
2004	College with Potential for Excellence (CPE) was conferred by the UGC
2006	Accredited at A^{+} Grade (Cycle II) by NAAC
2008	Five-storied Arrupe Library Building inaugurated
2012	Accredited at A Grade [Cycle III] by NAAC
2014	Introduction of School System Introduction of B. Voc. funded by UGC
2015	DBT – STAR College Status & DST FIST at Level ‘0’. Special Heritage Status awarded by the UGC
2019	Accredited at A^{++} Grade [Cycle IV] by NAAC
2023	Mega Toulouse Arena Building inaugurated

== History ==
Due to the efforts of Jesuit missionaries, the College made a humble beginning in a thatched roof with just one student and five Jesuit teachers at the coastal town of Nagapattinam in 1844, to cater for the educational needs of Native Indians, Anglo-Indians and Europeans without any discrimination. However, the student strength rose to 38 including 12 Indians by the close of that year.

In 1845, the College had 74 students, including 40 Indians. Students were taught Greek, Latin, Tamil, French, English, Geometry and Algebra. During the initial years, the College faced several hardships and deep distress due to inferno, tornado and cholera, all of which took a heavy toll on the College in the form of loss of life and property.

Until the establishment of the University of Madras in 1858, the College functioned more like free-lances in the field of higher education, offering educational services at free of cost to the desired students. After it was affiliated to the University of Madras in 1866, it began to be governed by University rules and regulations and its strength rose to 400 students. The College was by then offering Matriculation, Intermediate (also called F.A in those days) and B.A. degree courses.

Due to administrative reasons, the college was shifted to Trichinopoly, the centrally located town of Tamil Nadu, on 18 January 1881. No sooner the College had begun working from Trichinopoly than the cholera struck. Through sheer commitment, persistence and divine assistance, the College could tide over this huge crisis and continued to serve the cause of education and students' welfare.

In 1896, the College established a Symphony Orchestra Band to prepare students for a professional career in music. In 1900, the College introduced science courses as a response to the initiatives of the University to promote the study of sciences. To meet growing infrastructural requirements, the College completed the construction of two majestic buildings, the Lawley Hall and Digby Hall, by 1907. In 1911, the College inaugurated honours courses in Physics, Mathematics, Economics and History after a visit by the Madras University Commission in 1906 which strongly recommended the commencement of such courses.

In 1924, a course on Mechanical and Electrical Engineering was introduced, which was offered to the science students of the Intermediate and BA classes. A well-equipped workshop was set up with a financial outlay of Rs. 80000/= for teaching the course. However, this course was subsequently closed after a few years for want of demand.

From 1939–42, the College witnessed a flurry of construction activities including the Lawley wing projection, the first 2 blocks of the New Hostel, the Sacred Heart Hostel, the Brothers Hostel, the boarders kitchen and dining halls, the Bellarmine Hall and Guest House, and the Bertram building. The paving and diverting of the canal and expansion of the playgrounds were also carried out in the same periods.

In 1944–45, the College celebrated its centenary year with festive gaiety. By this time it had produced over 7000 graduates, and 4000 graduates were pursuing their degree courses at that time.

In 1965, the Chemistry department was recognised as a research department and offered a PhD programme from 1969. In 1969 the College celebrated its post-centenary Silver Jubilee. In recognition of the great service rendered by the College, a two-storey community centre was constructed with the financial assistance of the general public and friends and admirers of the College. To optimize the usage of the infrastructure and facilities available in the campus, an evening college was started in 1973.

In 1977, unprecedented floods invaded the College campus and the College was submerged for three days. Many of the College's rare informational and physical resources kept in the library and laboratories were destroyed. Over 40000 volumes kept in the library were reduced to pulp.

In 1985, the Science and Humanities for People's Development (SHEPHERD) programme was inaugurated as part of the Lab to Land initiative to share the scientific experiences gained by the students for the upliftment of the people. In 1989, the Sodality Chapel-cum-Inter-faith Prayer Centre was inaugurated.

In 1994, the College celebrated its sesquicentenary year by organizing year-long events that culminated with a large exhibition for the school children and general public.

In 1997, the College received internet facility and a library computerized information Service for the first time.

In 2006, the elegant and majestic Arrupe library building was constructed and inaugurated.

Between 2013 and 2020 infrastructure upgrades and renovations were carried out, including:

- erection of 2 lifts, one bridge connecting two main blocks, recycling of waste through Vermi-Compost Yard, Guest House;
- renovation of Chemistry, Physics, Herbarium Blocks and Lawley Hall;

In 2024, the Toulouse Arena was built and inaugurated.

== Credentials ==
=== UGC ===
In June 1978, college was conferred the autonomous status by a decree of the syndicate of the University of Madras. St. Joseph's College was one among the 8 colleges received the Autonomous status in Phase-I of UGC.

=== NIRF ===
College rankings

Dental – India
- NIRF (2024): 25

The annual feature of the ranking (done by NBA) by the MHRD initiative under 5 category, which is a measure of the performance of all higher education institutions at the college category is growing substantially from 2018 onwards as follows [Year : All India Rank (% / No. of Participating institutions)]: 2018:28 (54.41% /1087), 2019 :39 (54.70% /1304), 2020: 31(59.09%/1802), 2021:27 (59.09%/1802), 2022:26 (61.60 / 2270), 2023:25 (62.48/2746).

== Centres of Excellence ==
- Jerome Centre for Information and Communication (JCICT) - Estd.1998; It is one of the 4 four Computer Centres (others are departmental lab specific) hosting our College all ICT related activities for the benefit of staff and students such as maintaining the college website, ERP, online examinations, Wi-Fi, etc.
- Archbishop Casmir Instrumentation Centre (ACIC) - Estd.2009.
- Joseph's Hub for Languages (JHL) - Estd.2023

== Institutes of Excellence ==
- Rapinat Herbarium – It is a Taxonomic Research Centre which preserves a collection of specimens. 20 thousand specimens are digitized and the centre has identified 20 specimens new to science.
- Camboulives Band - Estd.1896; It serves as a conservatory.
- Newton Natural History Museum - Estd.1881; houses specimens, artefacts, geological materials, rock particles, numismatics and philately

== Academics ==
The College offers 18 Undergraduate, 20 Postgraduate, 13 M.Phil. (suspended due to UGC new regulation), and 15 Ph.D. programmes besides 2 B.Voc. programmes & 1 Honours. The School System was introduced in 2014 by forming five different schools with a view to maximizing resources, sharing expertise across disciplines and enhancing lateral mobility in order to achieve holistic development, cross-discipline exposure and augmenting employment opportunity. It has a strong staff strength with 320 plus teaching and 135 plus non-teaching staff. The college has a century - old Museum, Herbarium and Band, besides a library with 1.77 Lakh+ volumes of books, 5100 rare collections and 200+ print journals.

== Notable alumni ==
=== Politics ===
- A.P.J. Abdul Kalam, former President of India
- D. Napoleon, actor and former Minister of State for Social Justice and Empowerment
- N. Gopalaswami, former Chief Election Commissioner of India and Padma Bhushan award winner
- A. J. John, Chief Minister of Travancore-Cochin, Governor of Madras State, Indian freedom fighter and statesman
- Panampilly Govinda Menon, Chief Minister of Travancore-Cochin, freedom fighter and lawyer
- P. T. Chacko, first opposition leader of Kerala, second home minister of Kerala, freedom fighter and lawyer.
- P. K. Ittoop, former MLA of Kerala Legislative Assembly
- S. P. Adithanar, former Tamil Nadu Minister for Cooperation, and founder of the newspaper Dina Thanthi
- Joseph Mundassery, Keralan politician and literary critic
- Major Mariappan Saravanan, Indian army hero of Batalik, recipient of the Vir Chakra

=== Religion ===
- Bishop Joseph Pallikaparampil, Bishop Emeritus of the Diocese of Palai, Kerala
- Archbishop Michael Augustine, former Archbishop of Pondicherry and Cuddalore
- Bishop Rajarethinam Arokiasamy Sundaram, former Bishop of Thanjavur
- Fr Duraiswami Simon Amalorpavadass, priest and theologian

=== Academic ===
- G. N. Ramachandran, biophysicist
- V. R. Ramachandra Dikshitar, historian, indologist, and dravidologist
- R. S. Krishnan, experimental physicist and discoverer of the Krishnan Effect
- Balasubramanian Viswanathan, material scientist and emeritus professor at IIT Madras
- Subramanian Kalyanaraman, neurosurgeon, Shanti Swarup Bhatnagar laureate
- E. S. Raja Gopal, physicist, Shanti Swarup Bhatnagar laureate
- Fr K. M. Matthew SJ, priest and botanist

=== Arts ===
- Sandilyan, writer
- Sujatha, writer
- A. Srinivasa Raghavan, Tamil writer
- Srirangam Kannan, musician and artist
- S. A. Ashokan, actor famous for villain roles in Tamil films
- Prabhu Solomon, film director
- Vasanth, film director
- Sam C. S., music director and musician

=== Law ===
- A. R. Lakshmanan, former judge, Supreme Court of India
- S. Ashok Kumar, former judge, Madras High Court and Andhra Pradesh High Court

=== Sport ===
- Arokia Rajiv, Indian athlete

== See also ==
- List of Jesuit sites
