= Vishva (name) =

Vishva is an alternative name for Vishnu, which refers to the world, the universe. Vishva may also refer to:

- Vishva Chathuranga (born 1998), Sri Lankan cricketer
- Vishva Wijeratne (born 1992), Sri Lankan cricketer
- Vishva Malla (died 1560), King of Bhaktapur, Nepal
- Thakur Vishva Narain Singh (1928–2009), Indian journalist and Braille editor
- Acharya Vishva Bandhu, Indian Vedic scholar, writer and educationist
