= Dhirajlal Mahashankar Vishwanath Thaker =

Paymaster General of the Port of Karachi
- In office circa 1925 – 1947

Personal details
- Born: 1897 Wadhwan, Gujarat, India
- Died: 1947 (aged 49–50) Surendranagar, Gujarat, India
- Spouse: Mehwa Thaker

Dhirajlal Mahashankar Vishwanath Thaker (1897–1947) was a British colonial official and Paymaster General of the Port of Karachi; the largest wheat and cotton exporting port in British India prior to partition, currently the largest port in Pakistan. He was the son of Mahashankar Vishwanath Thaker, Chief Treasurer of the Princely State of Limbdi under Jhala Rajput rule and nephew of Pranjivan Vishwanath Thaker, Diwan of the Princely State of Vadia.

As effective Chief Financial Officer of the port, he reported directly to the Paymaster General of the United Kingdom on behalf of the Karachi Port Trust and was instrumental in developing the Port of Karachi as the main air entry into India. When Pakistan was created in 1947, the Port of Karachi was its capital, major seaport, and the country’s center for industry, administration, and business.

In 1900 at the age of three, he moved to Karachi from Gujarat with his father and four brothers. Prior to 1920 he returned to Gujarat to marry and subsequently raised five children. In 1947 he died of throat cancer after migrating modern-day Pakistan following the independence in 1947.
