= Bishwanath Ghosh =

Bishwanath Ghosh may refer:

- Bishwanath Ghosh (writer), Indian writer and journalist
- Bishwanath Ghosh (footballer), Bangladeshi footballer
