= Kashi Vishweshwar Temple, Kadugodi, Bengaluru =

Kashi Vishweshwar Temple, Kadugodi, Bangalore
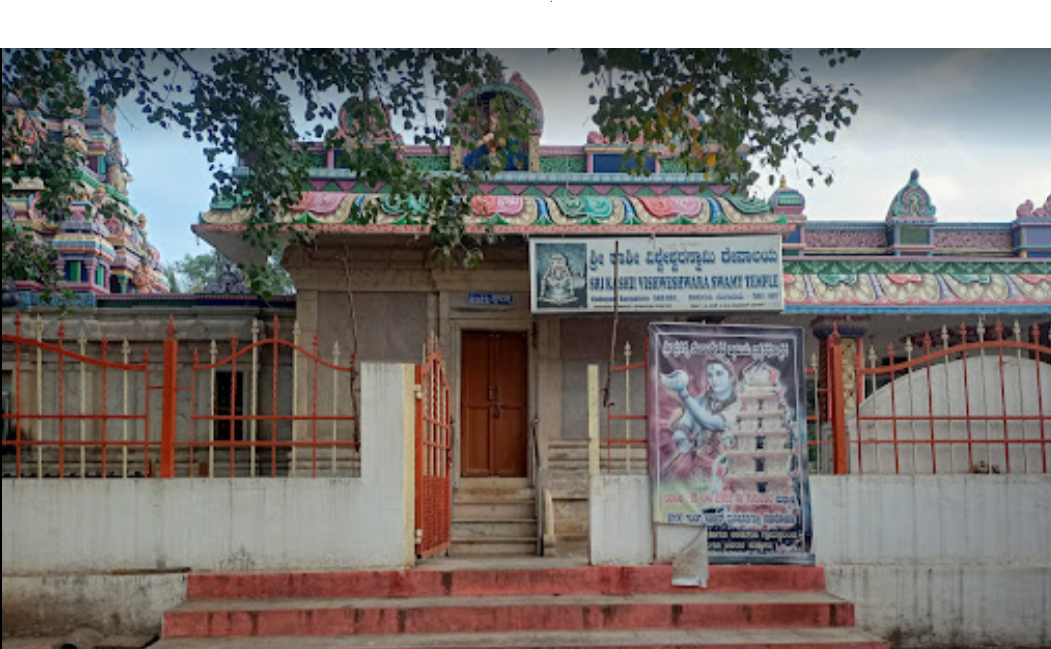

Religion
- Affiliation: Hinduism
- District: Bangalore Urban
- Deity: Lord Shiva

Location
- Location: Kadugodi
- State: Karnataka
- Country: India
- Interactive map of Kashi Vishweshwar Temple, Kadugodi, Bangalore

Kashi Vishweshwar temple is a Hindu temple in Kadugodi, Bangalore, Karnataka, India, is dedicated to the Lord Shiva. The temple dates back to the Chola King Rajendra Chola's Period.

The name of the locality "Kadugodi" came as this temple was built in center of the forest so the name Kadu (meaning forest in Kannada) and Gudi (meaning temple in Kannada). The Vaastu & Architecture have a strong resemblance to the Ganga dynasty, which preceded the Cholas. Inscriptions on the basement of the temple also refer to the deity as Rajadhi Raja Bhangisvaramhow. The original Shiva Linga mentioned in these inscriptions was stolen and replaced by a new one brought from Varanasi.
