= Viswanatha chikitsa =

1921 text on Ayurveda by Viswanatha Sen from West Bengal, India

Viswanatha chikitsa is a text written by physician Viswanatha Sen from West Bengal in India in 1921. This work reflects the popular Ayurvedic formulations of the author's practice. The text was originally published from Narendrapur of West Bengal in India. Until 2013, only few copies were available, published by Chaukhambha Orientalia. Viswanatha Chikitsa is among the list of books provided in the First Schedule of Drugs and Cosmetics Act 1940 in India.

== Authorship ==
Several physicians named Viswanatha Sen are present in the history of ayurveda.

The identity of the author becomes controversial since CCRAS (Central Council for Research in Ayurveda and Siddha) published a text Chikitsarnava in two parts by a different author also named Viswantha Sen, according to Mahesh Kumar C.S., the latest editor of Viswanatha Chikitsa. The author of Chikitsarnava lived in West Bengal while the author of Viswanatha Chikitsa first lived in West Bengal and moved to Orissa to work as King Prataparudra Gajapathi's court physician. In 1990 CCRAS published an article that mentions Chikitsarnava and Viswanatha Chikitsa as distinct.

Sen is believed to be the author of another book, Pathyapathyavinischaya.

Sen claimed that his father was Mahendranath and his teacher was Prabhakara. Mahendranath must be a follower of either Gananath Sen (1877–1945) or Gananath Sen's father, Viswanath Sen.

Vaidya Prabhakara was mentioned by Acharya Priyavrata Sharma. Prabhakara is believed to be the father of Vaidya Ramachandra, who authored the work Indrakosha (a lexicon on medicinal plants). Probably, he is Sen's teacher.

Viswanatha Vaidya (1623–76), son of Narayana is probably the author of Kosakalpataru.

== Structure ==
It is a small text consisting of seven chapters in total, each chapter containing ten formulations:

- Swarasa Prakarana (freshly extracted juices)
- Kashaya prakarana (decoctions)
- Churna prakarana (powders)
- Asava-Arishta prakarana (fermented products)
- Avaleha prakarana (linctus)
- Ghrita-taila prakarana (medicated ghee & oils)
- Gutika prakarana (tablets & pills)
