= Pipe Dreams: Water and Empire in Central Asia's Aral Sea Basin =

2018 book by Maya K. Peterson

- Author: Maya K. Peterson
- Language: English
- Subject: Environmental history and development studies
- Publisher: Cambridge University Press
- Publication date: 2019
- Publication place: United States
- Media type: Print and e-book
- Pages: 399
- ISBN: 978-1-108-47547-1

Pipe Dreams: Water and Empire in Central Asia's Aral Sea Basin is a 2019 book by the American historian Maya K. Peterson. The book discusses major water projects implemented and proposed during the Russian Empire and Soviet Union in Central Asia. Pipe Dreams received acclaim from critics, who recognized it as a substantial contribution to the environmental history of Central Asia.

The book is based on Peterson's PhD dissertation written at Harvard University. It is the result of her research in archives located in Russia, the United States, and Central Asian countries. Pipe Dreams is the only book authored by Peterson before her unexpected passing in 2021.

== Structure ==
The book examines the historical development of irrigation projects in Central Asia in chronological order. The first chapter discusses the water management ambitions of the Tsarist regime following its conquest of Turkestan and briefly deals with Central Asian water-use customs. Chapter 2 deals with events in the late 19th century and notable figures, such as Grand Duke Nicholas Konstantinovich of Russia and his irrigation efforts in Central Asia. Chapter 3 focuses on the Tsarist state's struggles to expand irrigation capabilities before World War I. Chapter 4 deals with the Chu River project in Jetisu as well as the Central Asian revolt of 1916. Chapter 5 deals with Bolsheviks' postwar irrigation initiatives. Chapter 6 discusses the Soviet five-year plans and large-scale irrigation projects implemented in the 1930s, including the Vakhsh River irrigation project and the Great Ferghana Canal. The epilogue connects these historical developments to the Aral Sea crisis.

== Reception ==
Pipe Dreams received acclaim from critics, particularly for Peterson's extensive archival research conducted across multiple countries. Marianne Kamp of Indiana University characterized the book as "a surprisingly fast-paced, multifaceted, and enjoyably readable volume." Sarah Cameron of the University of Maryland concluded that the work constitutes a significant contribution to the environmental history of Russia and the Soviet Union. Jennifer Keating of University College Dublin praised the book as an "excellent monograph." Jeff Sahadeo of Carleton University, praising the quality of the research that went into the book, concluded that it is a "book you hate to end."
