= Kotitirtha Tank =

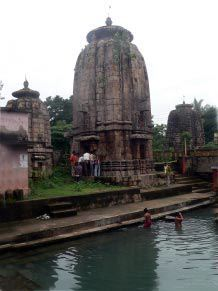

- Location in Orissa

Religion
- Affiliation: Hinduism
- Deity: shiva Shiva

Location
- Location: Bhubaneswar, Odisha, India
- State: Orissa
- Country: India
- Coordinates: 20°14′48″N 85°51′28″E

Architecture
- Type: Kalingan Style (Kalinga Architecture)
- Completed: 11th century AD
- Elevation: 22 m (72 ft)

Kotitirtha Tank, also known as Kotitirthesar Tank, is a sacred tank, used as a ritual bath in Hinduism, located near the Kotitirthesvara temple in the Kotitirthesvara lane, Old Town, Bhubaneswar, Odisha, India. It is now under the care and maintenance of the Kotitrithesvara Thakura Development Committee. The tank is enclosed within a masonry embankment made of dressed Laterite blocks.

== Tradition and legends ==
It is believed that the tank is a sacred bathing place for cleansing a person's sins. It is used by the locals for various ritual practices and offerings such as Pinda. "The temple tank is one of the Panchatirthas, the other four being Ganga-Yamuna Kunda, Bindu Sagar, Devi Padahara, and Papanasini. The deity in the adjoining temple on the western embankment is named "Kotitirthesvara" after the sacred tank Kotitirtha".

== Location ==
The public temple is owned by multiple persons, maintained by the Kotitirthesvara Thakura Development Committee, and is located on Kotithirthesvara lane, Oldtown, Bhubaneswar.

== Age ==
The precise age is not known and the approximate age could not be ascertained. However, the tank may be older than the temple assigned to the 11th century AD.

== Property Type ==
i) Precinct/ Building/ Structure/Landscape/Site/Tank: Tank

ii) Subtype: Spring

iii) Typology: Embankments

== Property use ==
i) Abandoned/ in use: In-use

ii) Present use: Ritual as well as normal bathing

iii) Past use: Could not be ascertained

== Significance ==
i) Historical significance: Somavamsi 260.

ii) Cultural significance: — Sivaratri, Jalasayii, Kartika Purnima, Sankranti are observed.

The tank is considered sacred as one of the Panchatheertha, the other four being Ganga-Yamuna Kunda, Bindu Sagar, Devi Padahara, and Papanasini. The Kotitirtha Tank is viewed a sacred site for ritual bathing, ritual practices such as pinda, and the cleansing of sins

== Physical description ==
i) Surroundings: The tank has embankments on all four sides. The temples of Kotitirthesvara and Visvanatha stand on the western embankment. On the southern embankment, through a channel in a southern wall, the excess water of the spring and wastewater is discharged into the Lingaraja Temple West Canal, as a result, the water level of the tank remains constant throughout the year. The northeastern corner has a clubhouse, whereas, the northwestern corner houses a recently built Siva temple that partly encroaches on the ancient tank.

ii) Orientation: Bathing ghats are provided with steps in the western embankment.

iii) Architectural features: Rectangular on plan measuring 19.75 meters length, 9.75 meters breadth and 1.56 meters depth

vi) Building material: Dressed in the Laterite blocks

vii) Construction techniques: Dry masonry

ix) Special features: It is fed by an underground natural spring. The water is fresh and clean, and used for ritual bathing as well as a community bath by the locality.

== State of preservation ==
i) Good/Fair/ Showing Signs of Deterioration/Advanced: Good

ii) State of Decay/Danger of Disappearance: Is not in any sort of decaying condition.

== Condition description ==
i) Signs of distress: Growth of vegetation in the embankments.

ii) Structural problems: It has to be refurbished.

iii) Repairs and Maintenance: Looked after, with repairs and maintenance made annually by the authority.

== Grade (A/B/C) ==
i) Architecture: B

ii) Historical: B

iii) Associational: A

iv) Social/Cultural: A

== Threats to the property ==
Conservation Problem and Remedies: The ancient tank needs renovation to clear the sludge, accumulation of silt, and clay.
