= T. K. Viswanathan =

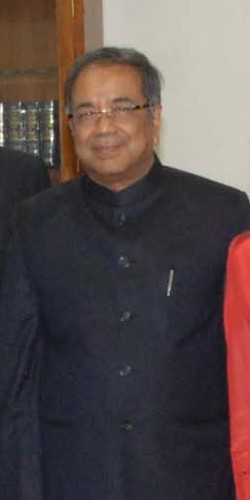
- Shown in 2012

Secretary General of Lok Sabha & Lok Sabha Secretariat

Personal details
- Born: 14 October 1948 (age 77) Chennai, Tamil Nadu, India
- Spouse: Sudha Viswanathan
- Children: 2 sons
- Awards: Padma Shri (2017)

T. K. Viswanathan (born 14 October 1948) is the Secretary General of the 15th Lok Sabha and Lok Sabha Secretariat, Parliament of India, i.e. the House of the People in the Indian Parliament. As Secretary General, he is also the Administrative head of the Secretariat of the Lok Sabha. The post of Secretary General is of the rank of the Cabinet Secretary in the Government of India, who is the senior most civil servant to the Indian Government. The incumbent to the post is appointed by the Speaker of Lok Sabha in consultation with the Prime Minister of India and the Leader of the Opposition in the Lok Sabha. As per precedence, incumbents to the post of Secretary General have either been senior officers in the Lok Sabha Secretariat or senior civil servants in the Government of India.

In 2017, Government of India awarded him the fourth highest civilian award Padma Shri for his work in the field of literature & education.
