= A. K. Viswanathan =

Indian police officer

A.K. Viswanathan
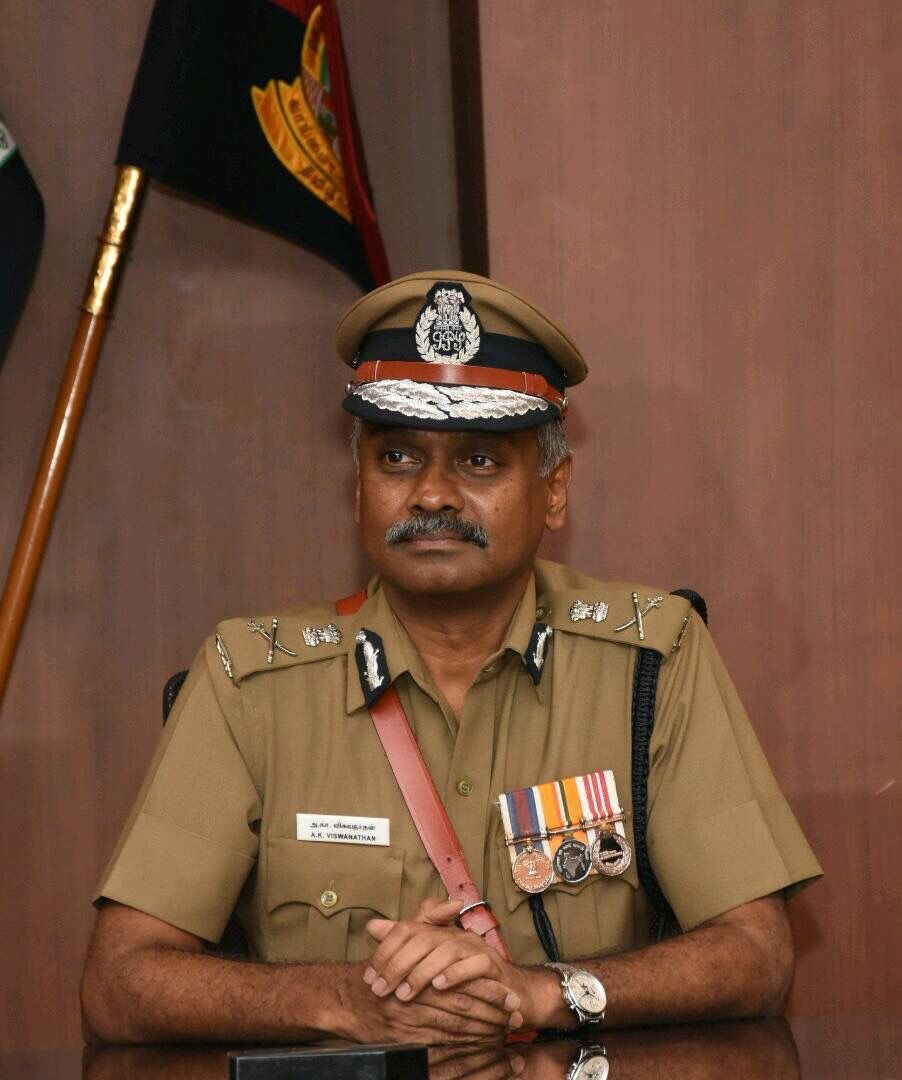
- Born: 26 July 1964 (age 62); Ayyampalayam, Pollachi, Coimbatore district, Tamil Nadu, India
- Education: Presidency College, Chennai; Loyola College, Chennai; Madras Law College; University of Madras
- Office: Commissioner of Police, Greater Chennai
- Predecessor: Karan Singha
- Successor: Mahesh Kumar Aggarwal
- Spouse(s): Seema Agrawal, IPS
- Police career
- Allegiance: India
- Department: Indian Police Service
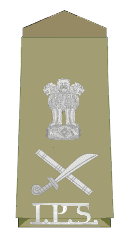
- Rank: Director General of Police
- Batch: 1990
- Awards: President's Police Medal for Meritorious Service (2006); President's Police Medal for Distinguished Service (2017)

A. K. Viswanathan (born 26 July 1964) is a retired Indian Police Service officer of the 1990 batch. He retired on 31 July 2024 as the Director General of Police, Tamil Nadu and Chairman & Managing Director of Tamil Nadu Police Housing Corporation Limited. He previously served as the Commissioner of Police, Greater Chennai, from 15 May 2017 to 1 July 2020, and Commissioner of Police, Coimbatore City.

== Early life and education ==
Born near Pollachi, in Coimbatore district of Tamil Nadu, Viswanathan is a third-generation police officer in his family. His wife, Seema Agrawal, is also an IPS officer and is presently serving in the rank of Director General of Police of the Tamil Nadu cadre.

Viswanathan grew up mostly in small towns, completing his schooling at Government Higher Secondary School, Bhavani, presently in Erode district. He joined B.Sc Chemistry at Presidency College, Chennai, but dropped out after a year. He thereafter pursued a B.A. in History from Loyola College. Subsequently, he studied law at the Madras Law College, specialising in Insurance Law. After joining the IPS, he completed his Master of Law (M.L.) in Mercantile Law and his Ph.D in Criminal Law from the University of Madras.

After completing the first year of B.L. at Madras Law College, he took a year off and went to New Delhi to prepare for the UPSC examinations. He returned and continued the B.L. course alongside his civil services preparation. In the 1990 UPSC results, he secured the first rank from the state of Tamil Nadu and opted for the Indian Police Service as his first and only choice. He was allotted to the Tamil Nadu Cadre.

== Career ==
=== Indian Police Service ===
Insignia	Rank	Date Acquired
	Director General of Police – DGP	September 2021
	Additional Director-General of Police – ADGP	November 2015
	Inspector General of Police – IG	2007
	Deputy Inspector-General – DIG	2006
	Superintendent of Police – SP	1992
	Assistant Superintendent of Police – ASP	October 1989

=== Early career ===
After institutional training at the Lal Bahadur Shastri National Academy of Administration in Mussoorie and the Sardar Vallabhbhai Patel National Police Academy in Hyderabad, Viswanathan served as a probationary Assistant Superintendent of Police in Vellore. On completion of his training, he was posted as the Assistant Superintendent of Police (ASP), Dharmapuri Sub Division, in Dharmapuri district.

On promotion as Superintendent of Police, he was posted as the Deputy Commissioner of Police (Law and Order), Madurai city. During this tenure, he was sent to the erstwhile Tirunelveli district to handle caste clashes in the Tenkasi area. In recognition of his work, he was posted as the Superintendent of Police, Madurai Rural District (presently Madurai and Theni districts combined), where he served for nearly two and a half years, gaining extensive experience in handling caste conflicts and administering a large police district.

=== State Special Branch and CBI ===
After the 14 February 1998 serial bomb blasts in Coimbatore City that resulted in the death of 69 people, the state intelligence setup was revamped. Viswanathan was posted as the Superintendent of Police, State Special Branch, where he served for three years. After a change of government in 2001, he had a brief stint in the Chennai City Traffic Police.

This was followed by a five-year central deputation to the Central Bureau of Investigation (CBI). He served as the Superintendent of Police, Anti-Corruption Branch, for both the Chennai and Cochin branches, and later as the Deputy Inspector General of Police, Special Crime Branch, covering the southern and western regions of India.

=== Intelligence and senior positions ===
In 2006, he was posted as the Deputy Inspector General of Police (DIG), Intelligence, Tamil Nadu. In this role, he oversaw the work of the Special Branch (political and law and order intelligence), Special Division (Hindu and Muslim fundamentalists), Q Branch (Sri Lankan militants, Naxalites, and Tamil extremists), and Security Branch (security of the Chief Minister of Tamil Nadu and visiting VIP dignitaries). Significant events during this tenure included the final conflict between the LTTE and the Sri Lankan Army and its fallout in Tamil Nadu, the trial and conviction of accused in the 1998 Coimbatore bombings, and the arrest of several important Naxalite leaders.

On promotion as Inspector General of Police, he was posted as the Joint Director in the Directorate of Vigilance and Anti-Corruption. He was then transferred to Chennai City Police as Additional Commissioner of Police (Law and Order). Within three months of taking charge, there was a police action against lawyers in the Madras High Court campus on 19 February 2009.

In June 2009, he was transferred and posted as the Joint Resident Commissioner, Tamil Nadu House, to enable him to work as Officer on Special Duty (OSD) to M. K. Alagiri, the Union Cabinet Minister for Chemicals and Fertilizers. Within a month and a half, he opted to return to Tamil Nadu State.

=== Commissioner of Police, Coimbatore ===
From Tamil Nadu House, he was transferred as the Chief of Vigilance and Security in Tamil Nadu Newsprint and Papers Limited (TNPL). After a year and a half in TNPL Karur, he was posted as the Commissioner of Police, Coimbatore City, where he served for three and a half years, making him the longest-serving Commissioner of Police in that city. He took various steps to bring police and public closer and to remove the animosity and distrust that people generally had towards the police.

During his tenure, as per the National Crime Records Bureau data, crimes reduced four-fold in Coimbatore city. While Tamil Nadu came first in the recovery of stolen properties in the entire country at 66%, Coimbatore City came first in the state, recovering 88% of stolen properties.

=== Additional Director General of Police ===
On promotion as Additional Director General of Police (ADGP) in November 2015, he was posted as the Chief Vigilance Officer of the Metro Transport Corporation. After a week, he was made the ADGP Home Guards, Tamil Nadu, where he served for about a year and a half. During the massive floods of Chennai in December 2015, he organised the Home Guards and volunteers and was instrumental in coordinating relief efforts, including the preparation and distribution of food for about 2 lakh (200,000) people affected by the floods.

=== Commissioner of Police, Greater Chennai ===
Viswanathan assumed charge as the Commissioner of Police, Greater Chennai Police, on 15 May 2017, an office he held until 1 July 2020.

The Greater Chennai Police under his tenure worked to embed contemporary technology in crime prevention and detection efforts, enabling an increased digital footprint in police systems and processes.

Viswanathan was instrumental in bringing the Greater Chennai jurisdiction under complete CCTV surveillance under the "Third Eye" programme to enhance crime prevention and detection in the city of Chennai. This project envisaged the installation of over 250,000 CCTV cameras across Chennai, a first-of-its-kind initiative. Other significant digital initiatives implemented during his tenure include the Facetagr app, a unique face recognition application which enables instant identification and matching of suspects with reference to pre-existing police records.

His tenure, marked by significant digital transformation initiatives of the Chennai City Police, resulted in a higher level of peace and order in Chennai. As per the NCRB data, Greater Chennai City was declared the safest metropolitan city in the country for women and children.

K-4 Anna Nagar police station was adjudged the fifth best police station in the entire country among 15,555 police stations. Tamil Nadu was also adjudged the best state for the maintenance of law and order by India Today in 2018, with substantial contribution from Greater Chennai Police.

=== Final postings and retirement ===
After a brief stint as ADGP Operations, he was posted as the Chairman and Managing Director of Tamil Nadu Police Housing Corporation in the rank of ADGP and subsequently DGP. He retired on 31 July 2024.

== Gifting of Pennycuick bust to UK ==
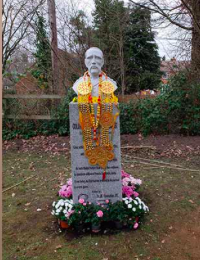
A bust of Colonel John Pennycuick gifted by A.K. Viswanathan

A white marble bust of Colonel John Pennycuick, the British Army engineer who sold his property in England to build the Mullaperiyar Dam, was gifted to his descendants by Viswanathan. This statue was unveiled at St Peter's Church in Frimley, UK, on 12 January 2019 by Indian High Commission Minister A. S. Rajan.

== Awards and recognition ==
Viswanathan was awarded the President's Police Medal twice: once for Meritorious Service in 2006 and the second President's Police Medal for Distinguished Service in 2017. He also received an award for taking prompt action on CM special cell petitions in March 2018.
