= Viswanathan Raghunathan =

Indian academic (born 1954)

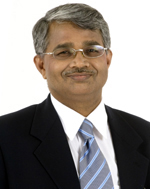
- Born: 19 September 1954; Ambala, Haryana, India
- Education: IIM Calcutta
- Occupations: CEO, academic, author, columnist
- Website: www.vraghunathan.com

Viswanathan Raghunathan (born 1954) is an academic, businessman, author, and columnist. He is currently director of the Schulich School of Business (York University, Toronto), India (Hyderabad Campus). Since 2013, for three consecutive years, Raghunathan has been featured in the list of top 50 thinkers in management across India and the Indian diaspora. Since 2005, he is also the CEO of GMR Varalakshmi Foundation. Earlier he was president, ING Vysya Bank (2001–2004) and managing director, GMR Industries Ltd (2007–2008), GMR Group. He has been an adjunct professor at the Bocconi University, Milan, Italy, since 1990, and Schulich School of Business, York University, Toronto, Canada. He taught finance and accounting at IIM, Ahmedabad from 1982 to 2001, where he held various positions, including chair, of the postgraduate program.

He is the author of Irrationally Rational (Penguin Viking, 2022), Games Indians Play (Revised Edition, Penguin, 2019), Return to Jammu (HarperCollins, 2018), The Good Indian's Guide to Queue-jumping (HarperCollins 2016), Beyond the Call of Duty (co-authored) (HarperCollins, 2015), Duryodhana (HarperCollins, 2014), Locks, Mahabharata & Mathematics (HarperCollins, 2013), Ganesha on the Dashboard (co-authored) (Penguin, 2012), Don’t Sprint The Marathon (HarperCollins, 2010), Corruption Conundrum and Other Paradoxes and Dilemmas (Portfolio, 2010), Stock Exchanges, Investments and Derivatives (co-authored) (McGraw-Hill Education (India), 2008), Games Indians Play (Penguin, 2006), Strategic Corporate Finance (co-authored) (Vision Books, 2001), Portfolio Management (co-authored) (Tata McGraw Hill, 1993), Stock Exchanges, Investments and Derivatives (Tata McGraw Hill, 1991).

Raghunathan is also a columnist of long standing, especially with The Economic Times, and has authored over 500 papers and articles. He also blogs for The Times of India and has held a cartoon column briefly with The Financial Express in the past. A graduate of Panjab University, Chandigarh, Raghunathan obtained his doctorate in finance from Indian Institute of Management, Calcutta.

Raghunathan is a Tamilian, born and brought up in Punjab and Haryana, and spent much of his early schooling in Jammu and Kashmir.
