= Viswanathan Kumaran =

Indian chemical engineer, rheologist and a professor (born 1966)

- Born: 17 June 1966 (age 60); Tamil Nadu, India
- Education: IIT Madras; Cornell University
- Known for: Studies on Rheology
- Awards: 1996 INSA Young Scientist Medal; 1997 Indian National Academy of Engineering Young Engineer Award; 2000 Shanti Swarup Bhatnagar Prize; 2011 IISc Prof. Rustom Choksi Award; 2014 TWAS Prize; 2014 TWAS Prize; 2016 Infosys Prize
- Scientific career
- Fields: Fluid dynamics
- Workplaces: Indian Institute of Science

Viswanathan Kumaran (born 17 June 1966) is an Indian chemical engineer, rheologist and a professor at the Department of Chemical Engineering of the Indian Institute of Science. He is known for his studies on stability of flow past flexible surfaces and is an elected fellow of the Indian Academy of Sciences, Indian National Science Academy and the Indian National Academy of Engineering. The Council of Scientific and Industrial Research, the apex agency of the Government of India for scientific research, awarded him the Shanti Swarup Bhatnagar Prize for Science and Technology, one of the highest Indian science awards for his contributions to Engineering Sciences in 2000. (Note: Long link - please select award year to see details) A recipient of the TWAS Prize in 2014 and the Infosys Prize 2016 in the Engineering and Computer Science category, Kumaran was listed in Asian Scientist 100, a list of top 100 scientists from Asia, by the magazine Asian Scientist.

== Biography ==
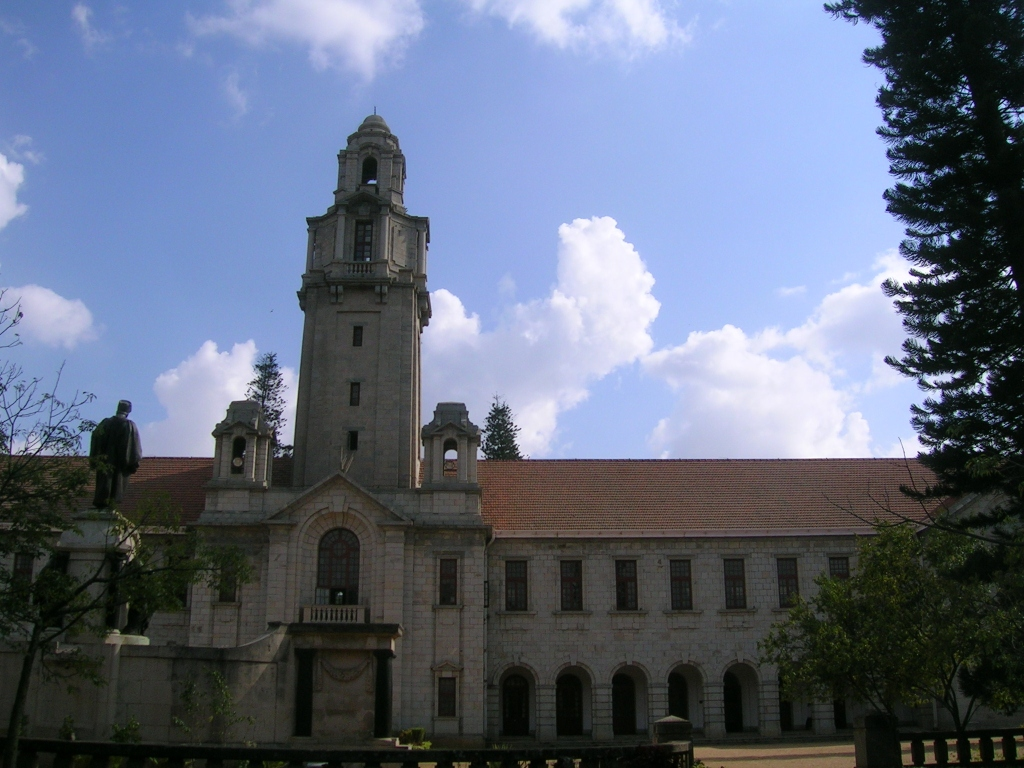
Indian Institute of Science

V. Kumaran, born on 17 June 1966 in the south Indian state of Tamil Nadu, earned his graduate degree in chemical engineering (BTech) from the Indian Institute of Technology, Madras (IITM) in 1987 and moved to the US for his higher studies and secured a PhD in 1991 from Cornell University. His post-doctoral studies were at the University of California, Santa Barbara during 1991–93 and on his return to India, he joined the Indian Institute of Science (IISc) as an assistant professor where he holds the position of a senior professor at the Department of Chemical Engineering and heads V. Kumaran's Research Group.

== Legacy ==
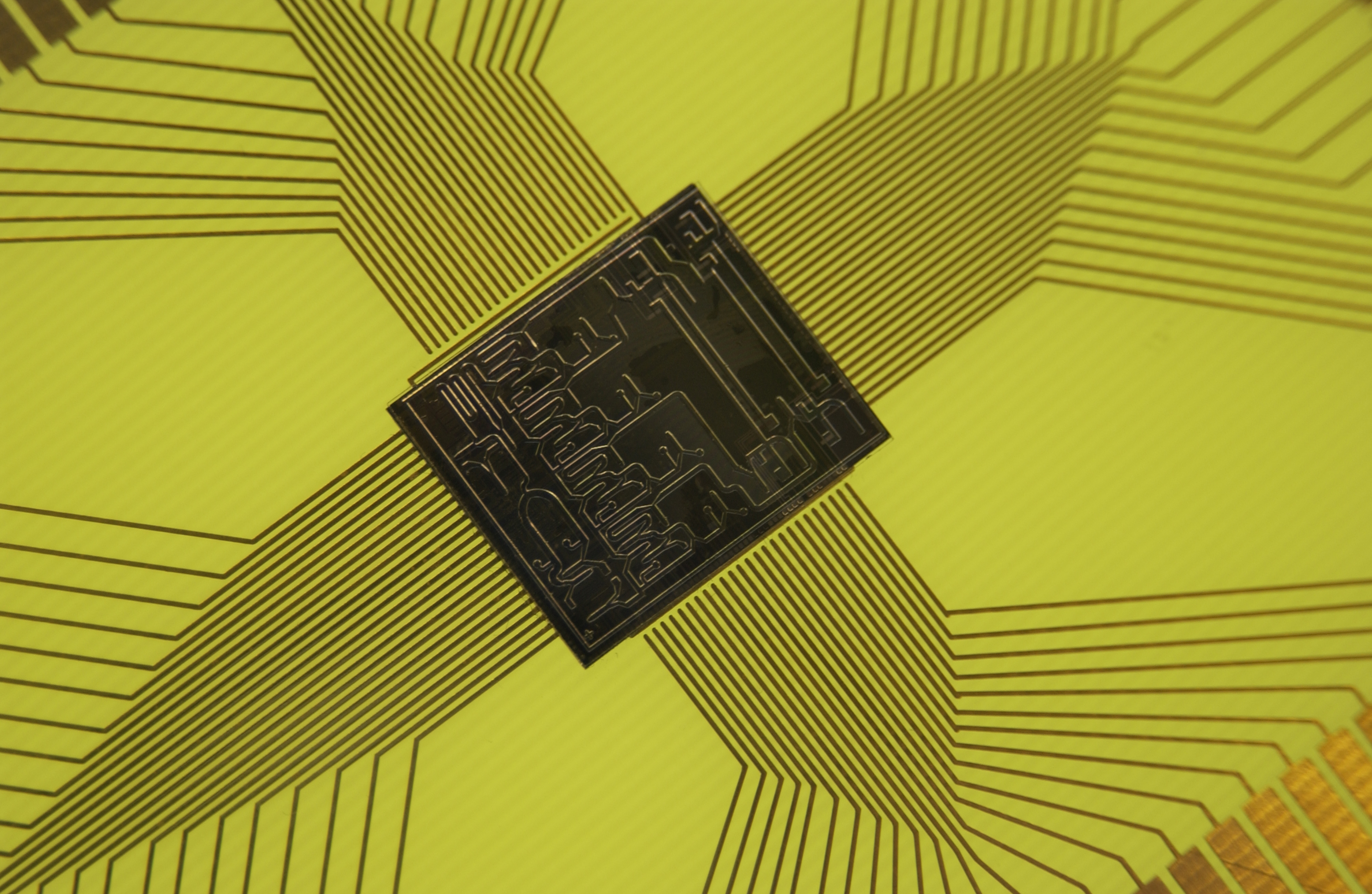
Lab-on-a-chip

Kumaran's work is focused on the field of complex flows of complex fluids and he is known to have carried out theoretical and experimental researches on the stability of flow past flexible surfaces. These researches, reported to be of significance in biological applications, microfluidics as well as in the marine and aerospace propulsion, were the first such studies in India and assisted him to demonstrate fluid inertia. The work has also assisted in developing Lab-on-a-chip devices used in cardiovascular and pulmonary Point-of-care diagnostics. He has documented his researches in several articles and the online article repository of the Indian Academy of Sciences has listed 48 of them. (Note: Please see Articles section) Besides, he has authored a book, Dynamics of suspensions with significant inertial effects and has contributed chapters to books edited by others which include Nonlinear Science and Complexity and Rheology of Complex Fluids, both published by Springer.

Kumaran, who has guided a number of master's and doctoral scholars in their studies and hosts many of them in his research group, coordinated the research program on Granular Physics organized by Kavli Institute for Theoretical Physics. He was one of the keynote speakers at The XVth International Congress on Rheology of the Society of Rheology held in August 2008 at Monterey, California, where he presented the theme papers on Rheology of dense sheared granular flows. His research group also hosts MicroX Labs, a start-up company, which won the first prize in the Tata Social Enterprise Challenge in 2013–14. His associations with science journals include memberships in editorial boards of Sadhana of the Indian National Academy of Engineering, Indian Journal of Chemical Technology of National Institute of Science Communication and Information Resources and Soft Materials of Taylor & Francis as well as the editorial advisory board membership of Acta Mechanica of Springer. He has attended several seminars and conferences where he has delivered keynote or invited speeches Chemical Engineering Colloquium of the Indian Institute of Sciences in December 2013, 2015 Annual Meeting of the American Institute of Chemical Engineers, and 68th Annual Meeting of the APS Division of Fluid Dynamics in November 2015 feature among them.

== Awards and honors ==
Kumaran received the Young Scientist Medal of the Indian National Science Academy in 1996. The Indian National Academy of Engineering awarded him the Young Engineer Award in 1997. INAE would honor him again in 2006 with an elected fellowship. In 1998, he was elected as a fellow by the Indian Academy of Sciences and he received the Amar Dye-Chem Award of the Indian Institute of Chemical Engineers in 1999. The Council of Scientific and Industrial Research awarded him the Shanti Swarup Bhatnagar Prize, one of the highest Indian science awards in 2000.

Kumaran became an elected fellow of the Indian National Science Academy in 2002 and was selected for the Swarnajayanthi Fellowship of the Department of Science and Technology of India the same year; he received the J. C. Bose National Fellowship of the DST, too, in 2007. Prof. Rustom Choksi Award for Excellence in Research of the Indian Institute of Science reached him 2011 and he shared the 2014 TWAS Prize with Chih-Yuan Lu of Vanguard International Semiconductor Corporation. The American Physical Society, which chose him as the APS-IUSSTF Chair Professor in 2014, elected him as a fellow in 2015 and the magazine Asian Scientist included him in the Asian Scientist 100 list in 2016 for his work on laminarturbulent transition of flow through soft-walled tubes and channels carried out during the year 2015, placing him at 73. The Infosys Science Foundation awarded him the Infosys Prize in 2016 for his research on complex fluids and complex flows and especially in transition and turbulence in soft-walled tubes and channels.

== Selected bibliography ==
=== Books ===
- Viswanathan Kumaran (1992). Dynamics of suspensions with significant inertial effects. Cornell University, January.
- Viswanathan Kumaran (2023). Fundamentals of transport processes with applications. Cambridge University Press. ISBN 978-1-009-00533-3.

=== Chapters ===
- J.A. Tenreiro Machado; Albert Luo; Ramiro S. Barbosa, Manuel F. Silva, Lino B. Figueiredo (3 November 2010). "Impulsive Boundary Layer Flow Past a Permeable Quadratically Stretching Sheet". Nonlinear Science and Complexity. 2nd Conference on Nonlinear Science and Complexity, held 28–31 July 2008, Porto. Springer Science & Business Media. pp. 191–. ISBN 978-90-481-9884-9.
- Abhijit P. Deshpande; J. Murali Krishnan; Sunil Kumar (20 September 2010). "Fundamentals of Rheology". Rheology of Complex Fluids. Springer Science & Business Media. pp. 35–. ISBN 978-1-4419-6494-6.

=== Articles ===
- Kumaran, V. (2009). "Dynamics of dense sheared granular flows. Part I. Structure and diffusion". Journal of Fluid Mechanics. 632 (a): 109–144. Bibcode:2009JFM...632..109K. doi:10.1017/S0022112009006776. S2CID 123659807.
- Kumaran, V. (2009). "Dynamics of dense sheared granular flows. Part II. The relative velocity distributions". Journal of Fluid Mechanics. 632 (a): 145–198. Bibcode:2009JFM...632..145K. doi:10.1017/S0022112009006958. S2CID 122721236.
- Kumaran, V. (2009). "Dynamics of a dilute sheared inelastic fluid. I. Hydrodynamic modes and velocity correlation functions". Physical Review E. 79 (1) 011301. Bibcode:2009PhRvE..79a1301K. doi:10.1103/PhysRevE.79.011301. PMID 19257024. S2CID 19907058.
- Kumaran, V. (2009). "Dynamics of a dilute sheared inelastic fluid. II. The effect of correlations". Physical Review E. 79 (1) 011302. Bibcode:2009PhRvE..79a1302K. doi:10.1103/PhysRevE.79.011302. PMID 19257025. S2CID 9997260.
- Chokshi, Paresh; Kumaran, V. (2009). "Stability of the plane shear flow of dilute polymeric solutions". Physics of Fluids. 21 (1): 014109–014109–15. Bibcode:2009PhFl...21a4109C. doi:10.1063/1.3063893. S2CID 123085633.

=== Presentations ===
- V. Kumaran (2016). "Ultra-Fast Microfluidic Mixing By Soft-Wall Turbulence". 2016 Annual Meeting - Conference Proceedings. American Institute of Chemical Engineers. Archived from the original on 2 February 2017.
- V. Kumaran (2016). "Transition in a Dense Granular Flow Down an Inclined Plane". 2016 Annual Meeting - Conference Proceedings. American Institute of Chemical Engineers. Archived from the original on 2 February 2017.
- Jaju, S.; Kumaran, V. (2016). "System Size Dependent Rheology of Sheared Lamellar Phases". 2016 Annual Meeting - Conference Proceedings. American Institute of Chemical Engineers. Archived from the original on 2 February 2017.
- Pradhan, D. S.; Kumaran, P. V. (2015). "The Generalized Onsager Model for a Binary Gas Mixture with Swirling Feed". 2015 Annual Meeting - Conference Proceedings. American Institute of Chemical Engineers. Archived from the original on 2 February 2017.
- Pradhan, D. S.; Kumaran, P. V. (2015). "Separation Analysis in a High-Speed Rotating Cylinder for a Binary Gas Mixture". 2015 Annual Meeting - Conference Proceedings. American Institute of Chemical Engineers. Archived from the original on 2 February 2017.

== See also ==
- Very-large-scale integration
- Point-of-care testing
- Rheology
