= Indira Viswanathan Peterson =

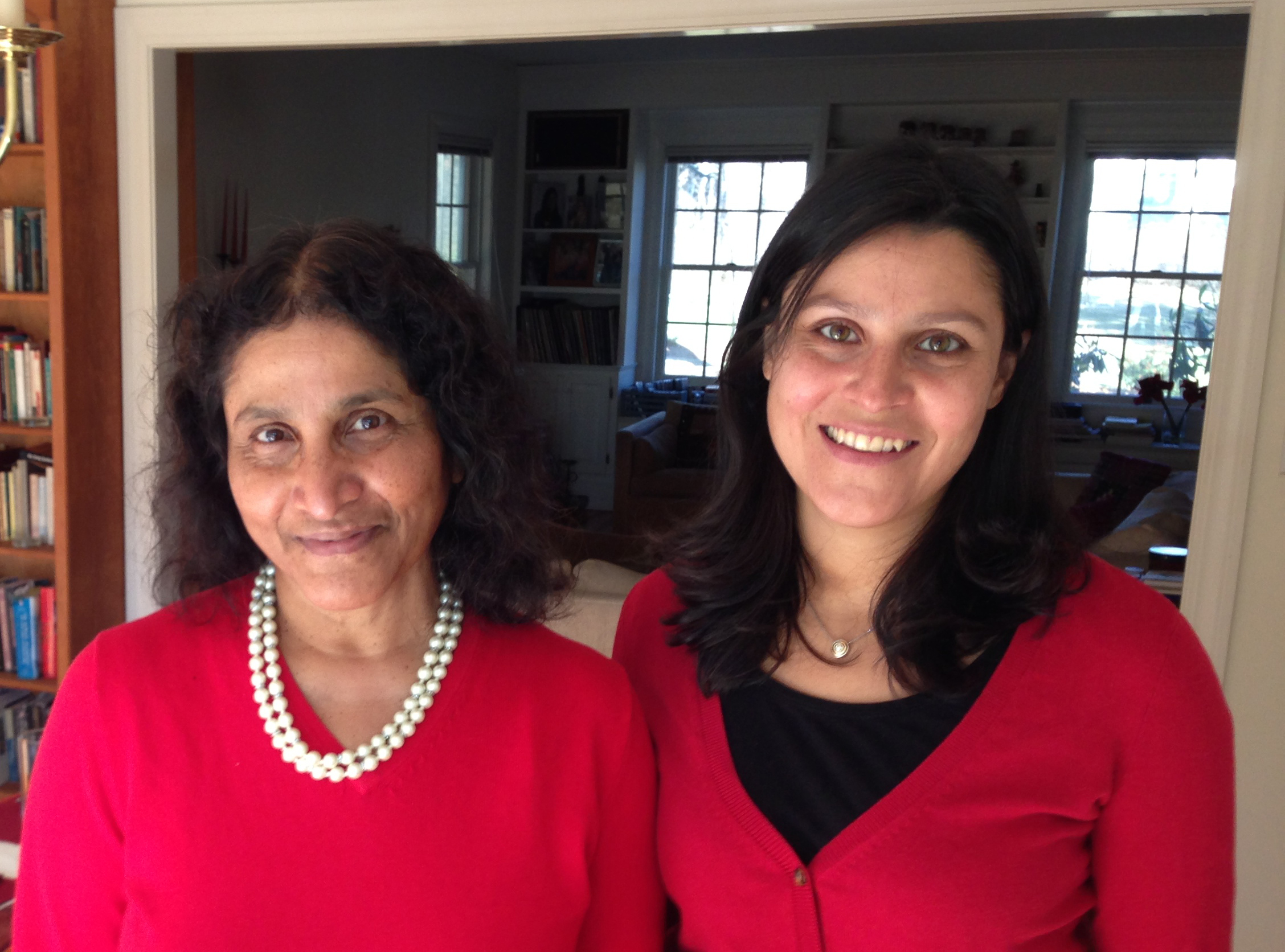
- Indira Peterson with her daughter Maya K. Peterson
- Born: Mumbai, India
- Occupation: South Asian studies
- Children: Maya K. Peterson
- Writing career
- Subject: Sanskrit
- Notable work: Poems to Siva: The Hymns of the Tamil Saints

Indira Viswanathan Peterson is a literary critic and the David B. Truman Professor of Asian Studies at Mount Holyoke College. She is a specialist in South Asian Studies.

== Background ==
Peterson was born and raised in Mumbai, India. She came to the United States as an AFS (American Field Service) exchange high school student in the late 1960s. She returned to Mumbai and received her B.A. in English literature from the University of Mumbai and her Ph.D. in Sanskrit from Harvard University in 1976. She has been a professor at Mount Holyoke since 1982, with a period at Columbia University from 2002 to 2004.

== Select scholarship ==
- Design and Rhetoric in a Sanskrit Court: The Kiratarjuniya of Bharavi, 2003
- Editor – Norton Anthology of World Literature , 2003
- Editor – Norton Anthology of World Masterpieces , 1997
- Poems to Siva: The Hymns of the Tamil Saints, 1989

== See also ==
- List of Indian Americans
