= T. R. Viswanathan =

American engineer

T. R. Viswanathan is an American engineer, who is currently the Silicon Laboratories Endowed Chair in Electrical Engineering at the Cockrell School of Engineering, University of Texas at Austin. He is formerly the Dean of the Indian Institute of Technology.
