= Visvanath Siva Temple, Bhubaneswar =

Visvanath Siva temple
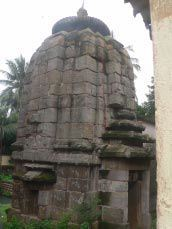

- Location in Orissa

Religion
- Affiliation: Hinduism
- Deity: shiva Shiva

Location
- Location: Bhubaneswar
- State: Orissa
- Country: India
- Interactive map of Visvanath Siva temple
- Coordinates: 20°14′48″N 85°51′28″E

Architecture
- Type: Kalingan Style (Kalinga Architecture)
- Completed: 11th century A.D.
- Elevation: 22 m (72 ft)

Visvanath Siva temple is situated in the Kotitirthesvara temple precinct in Bhubaneswar, Orissa, India.

== Location ==
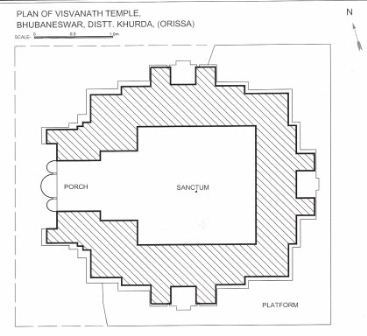
Plan of temple (as depicted in Lesser Known Monuments of Bhubaneswar by Sadasiba Pradhan)

The temple is facing towards west and is abandoned, without any enshrining deity in the sanctum. It is maintained by the Kotitirthesvara Thakura Development Committee. Orissa State Archaeology renovated it during the 10th and 11th Finance Commission Awards. The local people say that the lingam was shifted to a modern temple located in the north-east corner of the precinct. The temple is surrounded by residential buildings in the west, Kotitirthesvara tank in the east and Kotitirthesvara temple in the north. The temple is of Rekha order.

== Reference notes ==
Pradhan, Sadasiba. Lesser Known Monuments of Bhubaneswar. ISBN 81-7375-164-1.
