= Raman Viswanathan =

Indian physician (1899–1982)

- Born: 8 September 1899; Nagercoil, Travancore, British India
- Died: 14 July 1982 (aged 82); India
- Occupations: Pulmonologist; Physician; Medical mycologist
- Known for: Chest diseases
- Spouse: Sharda
- Children: 2
- Awards: Padma Bhushan; NAS Eugeno Morelli Prize; Forlanini Medal; INSA Dhanwantari Prize

Raman Viswanathan (8 September 1899 – 14 July 1982) was an Indian chest physician, medical mycologist and pulmonologist, considered by many as the father of Chest Medicine in India. He was the founder director of Vallabhbhai Patel Chest Institute, a postgraduate medical institute based in Delhi. An elected fellow of the American College of Chest Physicians, Royal College of Physicians of London, Indian National Science Academy and the Academy of Medical Sciences, United Kingdom, he was a recipient of several honors including the Forlanini Medal by Italian Tuberculosis Association and the Eugeno Morelli Prize of the National Academy of Sciences, Italy. The Government of India awarded him the third highest civilian honour of the Padma Bhushan, in 1974, for his contributions to medicine.

== Biography ==
R. Viswanathan was born on 8 September 1899 in Nagarcoil, in the southern tip of India in the state of Tamil Nadu to a government official in the erstwhile Travancore state as the youngest of his two children. After losing his mother at the age of nine, he stayed with his elder sister's family and did his schooling in Nagarcoil. Later, he secured his graduate degree with honours in Science and English literature from the Maharaja's College (present-day University College Thiruvananthapuram) of the University of Madras in 1921 after which he graduated in medicine from Madras Medical College in 1926. Continuing at the same institution, he passed MD in 1931 and became a member of the Royal College of Physicians of London, the next year. During this period, he also worked as an Assistant Professor of Medicine at Madras Medical College but moved to Andhra Medical College, Visakhapatnam in 1934 as the Professor of Clinical Medicine, where he worked till 1941. In between, he took a hiatus from work and obtained Diploma in Tuberculosis Diseases (TDD) from Cardiff University School of Medicine, Wales, UK, in 1938. When World War II broke out, he joined Indian Armed Forces in 1942 as an Officer-Commanding of the Medical Division and served as a Medical Specialist and adviser. After the war, he retired from the Army and joined the Union Government and worked in various capacities such as an adviser on Tuberculosis (1946–48) and as the Deputy Director General of Health Services (1948–57). He was also associated with the University of Delhi during this period, as the head of the Department of Medicine and as the Dean of the Faculty of Medical Sciences.

During his tenure with the Government of India, Viswanathan was appointed as the director of Vallabhbhai Patel Chest Institute (VPCI) when the institution was established in 1953. He served as the honorary director till 1957 and continued as a full-time director till his superannuation in 1964. Post his regular career, he was made the Honorary Professor of VPCI and the Emeritus Scientist of the Council of Scientific and Industrial Research (CSIR) and held both the posts till his death, involving himself in research, in post graduate medical education, in organizing medical conferences or delivering keynote addresses at various conferences in India and abroad. He also served as the Honorary Research Director cum Consultant at the Rajendra Memorial Research Institute of Medical Sciences.

Dr. Viswanathan was first married to Parvathi, a homemaker, and then to Dr. Sharada, a gynaecologist at the Government Hospital, Delhi. Dr. Viswanathan has two children from his first marriage to Parvathi; his son, Prof. V. Raman, who was an Environmental Engineering scientist and the daughter, V. Kamla, a homemaker. He died on 14 July 1982, at the age of 82.

== Legacy ==
Viswanathan was involved in the establishment of several medical organizations. He was among the group of medical professionals who founded the National Academy of Medical Sciences in 1961. He was the founder president of the Association of Chest Physicians of India and stayed at the post till its reorganization in 1981. He was one of the founders of the Asthma and Bronchitis Foundation of India and was its president since its inception. He also served as the president of many national and international conferences including the 8th National Congress of Diseases of the Chest (1963), the Conference of the Association of Physicians of India (1968), the National Tuberculosis Conference (1968) and the World Congress on Asthma, Bronchitis and Allied Conditions (1974). He was also involved with the activities of the Tuberculosis Association of India as a member of its various committees, and was the leader of the USAID Exchange Program of 1953 as well as the Indian Regent of American College of Chest Physicians during 1957–58 when he was entrusted with the investigation of infectious hepatitis in Delhi.

Viswanathan was credited with pioneering research in bronchopulmonary diseases and was reported to be the first researcher to propose tropical eosinophilia as a distinct clinical entity in 1936. His studies of autopsy reports of the patients died of tropical eosinophilia helped to define the pathology of the disease for the first time and established positive leucocyte adhesion phenomenon with M. bancrofit. He developed a novel bronchography technique and made innovations in tomography procedures. His researches also covered several other diseases such as cerebral malaria, basal tuberculosis, lung atelectasis, bronchiectasis, emphysema, bagassosis, byssinosis, and high altitude pulmonary oedema, among others. He published seven books which included Pulmonary Tuberculosis, Diseases of the Chest, Medical Problems of Old Age and more than 230 medical articles in peer reviewed journals, Epidemiology, Infectious hepatitis in Delhi (1955-56): a critical study-epidemiology and A review of the literature on the epidemiology of infectious hepatitis being some of the notable ones; his articles and books have been cited in several medical journals and text books, too. He also founded a medical journal, the Indian Journal of Chest Diseases and Allied Sciences (IJCDAS) in 1959 as the publishing arm of Vallabhbhai Patel Chest Institute.

== Awards and honors ==
Viswanathan, a founder fellow of the National Academy of Medical Sciences (1964) and an honorary physician to the President of India, was an elected fellow of the Indian National Science Academy (1968), National College of Chest Physicians (India), Royal College of Physicians of London (1980), American College of Chest Physicians (1947) and Academy of Medical Sciences. He was a member of such medical societies as American Thoracic Society, the British Thoracic Society, Indian Association of Pathologists, Associations of Physicians of India and Indian Medical Association. The National Academy of Sciences, Italy awarded him the Eugeno Morelli Prize in 1969 and the Italian Tuberculosis Association followed suit with its Forlanini Medal. He received the Dhanwanthari Prize of the Indian National Science Academy in 1971. Three years later, the Government of India included him the 1974 Republic Day Honours list for the third highest civilian award of the Padma Bhushan.

After his death in 1982, Vallabhbhai Patel Chest Institute renamed the main hospital complex as Viswanathan Chest Hospital in honor of its founder director. National Conference on Pulmonary Diseases (NAPCON) has instituted an annual oration, Prof. Raman Viswanathan Memorial Chest Oration, in his honor; the 2015 lecture was delivered by noted pulmonologist, S. K. Katiyar. Candida viswanathii, a yeast species and a common pathogen causing fungal infections, is named after him. His life has been documented in his autobiography, While the Light Lives - Reminiscences of a Medical Scientist, as well as in an article, Dr. R. Viswanathan : a profile, published in the Indian Journal of Chest Disease and Allied Science, the official journal of Vallabhbhai Patel Chest Institute and the National College of Chest Physicians.

== Selected bibliography ==
- R. Viswanathan (January 1957). "Epidemiology". Indian J Med Res. 45 (Suppl): 1–29. PMID 13438536.
- R. Viswanathan (January 1957). "A review of the literature on the epidemiology of infectious hepatitis". Indian J Med Res. 45 (Suppl): 145–55. PMID 13438550.
- R. Viswanathan (1957). "Infectious hepatitis in Delhi (1955-56): a critical study-epidemiology". Natl Med J India. 26 (6): 362–77. PMID 25074004.
- R. Vishwanathan (1964). Respiratory allergy; a symposium. Asia Publishing House. p. 131. OCLC 2558217.
- R. Viswanathan (January 1968). Diseases of the Chest. Asia Publishing House. p. 376. ISBN 978-0210312438.
- R. Viswanathan, A. S. Paintal (1968). Postgraduate medical education in India. Asia Publishing House. p. 723. OCLC 155748194.
- R. Viswanathan (1969). Medical Problems of Old Age. Current Technical Literature. p. 126. OCLC 69810.
- R. Vishwanathan, ed. (1972). Advances in medicine. Association of Physicians of India. p. 483. OCLC 3613230.
- R. Vishwanathan, ed. (1972). Advances in medicine. Association of Physicians of India. p. 483. OCLC 14426689.
- R. Viswanathan (1975). While the Light Lives - Reminiscences of a Medical Scientist. Asthma and Chronic Bronchitis Foundation of India. p. 288.
- R. Viswanathan, O. P. Jaggi (1977). Advances in chronic obstructive lung disease : proceedings of the World Congress on Asthma, Bronchitis & Conditions Allied. Asthma and Bronchitis Foundation of India. p. 893. OCLC 4655837.
- R. Viswanathan (1982). "Smoking and health". Indian Journal of Chest Diseases & Allied Sciences: 240. OCLC 35380316.
- R. Viswanathan (July 1996). Pulmonary Tuberculosis. Asia Publishing House. p. 150. ISBN 978-0210312148.
- R. Viswanathan (1966). Pulmonary tuberculosis. Asia Publishing House. p. 150. OCLC 6325416.
