= Mahashankar Vishwanath Thaker =

19th century administrator in Limbdi

Chief Treasurer of the Princely State of Limbdi
- In office c. 1890 – c. 1902

Personal details
- Born: c. 1867 Wadhwan, Gujarat, India
- Died: c. 1902 Wadhwan, Gujarat, India

Mahashankar Vishwanath Thaker (c. 1867 – c. 1902), was Chief Treasurer of the Princely State of Limbdi under Jhala Rajput rule. He was the younger brother of Pranjivan Vishwanath Thaker, Diwan of the Princely State of Vadia.

He died young at the age of 35 but had five sons, one of whom was Dhirajlal Thaker, Paymaster General of the Port of Karachi.
