= Ramakrishnan Vishwanathan =

Indian Army officer (1960-1999)

Lieutenant Colonel R Vishwanathan VrC
- Born: 12 January 1960; Kochi, Kerala
- Died: 2 June 1999 (aged 39); Tololing, Kargil, Kashmir, India
- Spouse: Jalja Vishwanathan
- Military career
- Allegiance: Republic of India
- Branch: Indian Army
- Service years: 1980–1999
- Rank: Lieutenant colonel
- Unit: 18 Grenadiers
- Conflicts: Kargil War; Operation Vijay
- Awards: Vir Chakra

Lieutenant Colonel Ramakrishnan Vishwanathan, VrC was the second-in-command of 18 Grenadiers which was conducting operations on and around Tololing mountain, Drass sector, Kargil, during Operation Vijay. He was posthumously awarded the Vir Chakra for his actions during the Kargil War. A Tripunithura a street near Eroor Pisharikovil Temple is named in his honour.

== Early life ==
Vishwanathan was born to V Ramakrishna Iyer and Kamala, in 1960. He was raised in Kochi and attended Kendriya Vidyalaya at Gandhi Nagar in Kadavanthra.

== Military life ==
Vishwanathan was commissioned into the Indian Army in June 1981 after completing his military training from National Defence Academy in 1980. He had served with the Indian Peacekeeping Force in Sri Lanka and later with the UN Peacekeeping Force in Angola.

The then Colonel Khushal Thakur, commanding-officer of the 18 Grenadiers, recalled Vishwanathan's courage with the narrative, "The 18 Grenadiers had launched three unsuccessful attacks on Tololing. On 2 June, Lt. Col. R Vishwanathan volunteered to go."

== Vir Chakra Citation ==
The citation for the Vir Chakra reads as follows

Gazette Notification: 113Pres/98,15-8-99
Operation: Vijay – Kargil
Date of Award: 1999

Citation: During 'Operation Vijay', Lieutenant Colonel Ramakrishnan Vishwanathan was the Second-in-Command of 18 Grenadiers, which was conducting operations in the Tololing area of Drass sector. He displayed rare valour in closing in on enemy positions under prohibitive enemy automatic fire and intense artillery shelling, thus taking the enemy by complete surprise along a very difficult approach and terrain at an altitude ofover 15,000 feet. During the attack, Lieutenant Colonel Vishwanathan sustained multiple gunshot wounds. In spite of being severely injured he refused to be evacuated and exhorted his troops to press on further. He charged through enemy defences destroying three enemy positions and eliminated four intruders single-handedly in a close hand-to-hand combat. Due to his efforts, the battalion could secure afoothold on the enemy location which later facilitated capture of Point 4590.

Though Second-in-Command of his unit, Lieutenant Colonel Ramakrishnan Vishwanathan disregarded his seniority and preferred being where his men were fighting: and led from the front during assaults on well-fortified enemy positions in Tololing. He however succumbed to his injuries making the supreme sacrifice for the nation in the best traditions of the Indian Army.
