= Sri Kasi Vishwanatha Temple Flint =

Hindu temple in Nashville Metropolitan Area

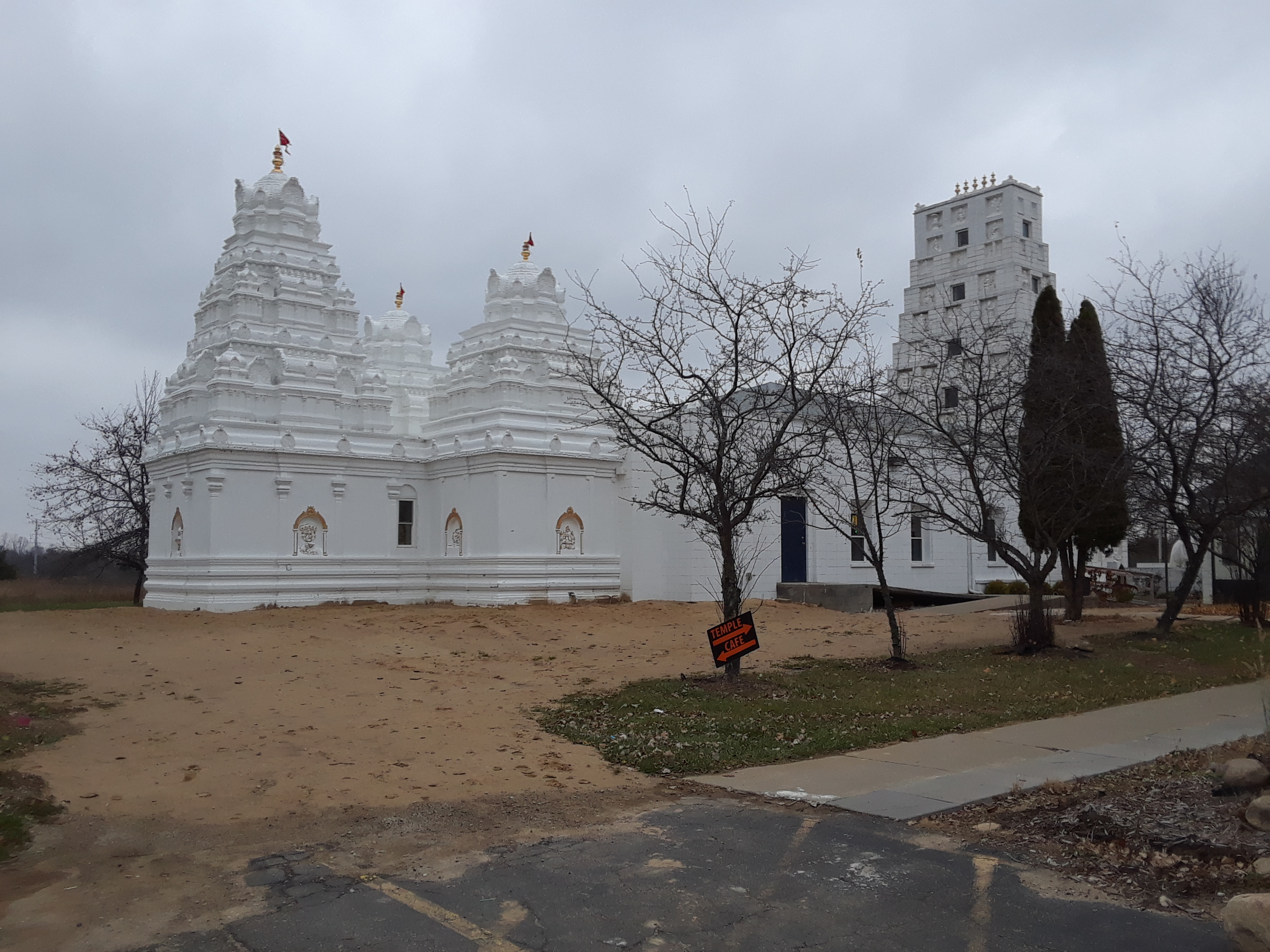

- Location in Michigan

Religion
- Affiliation: Hinduism
- Deity: Shiva

Location
- Location: Flint
- State: Michigan
- Country: United States
- Interactive map of Sri Kasi Vishwanatha Temple Flint
- Coordinates: 43.011962°N 83.810379°W

Website
- www.kasitempleflint.org

The Sri Kasi Vishwanatha Temple is a Hindu temple located in Flint, Michigan. The temple is dedicated to Shiva, who is revered as Kasi Vishwanatha. The temple serves as a religious and cultural center for the Hindu community in Flint and the surrounding areas, providing a space for worship, cultural events, and religious education.

== Architecture ==
The Sri Kasi Vishwanatha Temple was constructed in a traditional South Indian temple design. The temple includes a gopuram (tower), intricate carvings throughout the temple, and a sanctum sanctorum (garbhagriha) where the main deity, Shiva, is enshrined. The temple's design features various Hindu deities and incorporates elements from Dravidian architecture and includes depictions of scenes from Hinduism.

The temple is named after the famous Kashi Vishwanath Temple in Varanasi, India, a temple dedicated to Shiva. The temple's name was taken to provide spiritual harmony with one of Hinduism's most revered sites.

== Deities ==
The main shrine is dedicated to Shiva. In addition, the temple also has the images of deities, including Parvati, Ganesha, Murugan.

== Design ==
The temple is 65 feet tall at its peak with more than 126 deities sculpted into the facade of the temple, several of which are also represented by mutris inside. It has carvings on every single pillar of various Hindu deities and is made almost entirely out of white limestone. The interior boasts a prayer hall and a Cafeteria.
