= Viswanathan Manikan =

Indian community activist

- Born: 28 July 1951 (age 75)
- Education: Christ College, Irinjalakuda, Kerala, India
- Awards: Dubai Cares Award 2012, Masala! Awards 2014

Viswanathan Manikan (28 July 1951- 1 Feb 2026) is a community activist and key supporter of global anti-poverty movement. Addressing key issues of hunger, education, HIV/AIDS, and relief mobilization have been his core humanitarian objectives.

He has authored the book The Blu Ribbon Revolution: Co-creating a World Beyond Poverty that addresses global poverty and the role of alleviation efforts with an emphasis on CSR.

He was a recipient of the 2012 Dubai Cares Humanitarian Award and is a resident of Thrissur, Kerala.

== Biography ==
=== Academic career ===
Viswanathan Manikan was born in Porathissery, a farming village of Irinjalakuda, a municipal town in the southern Indian state of Kerala. Both his parents were from the farming community.

He completed his formal education at National High School and Christ College, Irinjalakuda. He received his BA in Economics from Calicut University in Kerala.

Manikan is a member of the International Byron Society and was a special invitee to the 38th International Byron Society conference held at Notre Dame University, Lebanon.

=== Humanitarian and philanthropic work ===
Manikan moved to Dubai in 1985 and pursued his interest for social services alongside his professional commitments at a global corporation. Manikan's primary efforts were in the areas of welfare of blue collar workers.

His area of work further expanded to environmental sustainability, poverty alleviation and relief and disaster management. He has travelled extensively to Africa, Europe, Asia and South America across 60 countries, largely those in LDCs (Least developed country). Manikan has been actively engaged in mobilization of pro-bono services and funds for NGOs that work to fight hunger and poverty.

=== Honourable distinctions ===
In 2012, he received the prestigious Dubai Cares Humanitarian Award from Sheikh Maktoum Bin Mohammed Bin Rashid Al Maktoum, Deputy Ruler of Dubai in recognition of his support for Dubai Cares global and local projects.

In 2014, Manikan received the award for Best Charity in the Individual category at the 7th Masala ! Awards. The award ceremony was held at the Madinat Jumeirah and he was felicitated for his outstanding contribution in the field of humanity.
