= Balasubramanian Viswanathan =

Indian material scientist

- Born: 15 September 1941 (age 85)
- Education: IIT Madras; St. Joseph's College, Tiruchirappalli
- Known for: catalysis and material science
- Scientific career
- Fields: Materials science and catalysis
- Workplaces: IIT Madras

Balasubramanian Viswanathan also known as BV, is a highly accomplished Indian material scientist, an emeritus professor at IIT Madras and husband of late Vijayalakshmi Viswanathan, the first woman financial commissioner of Indian Railways. He is well known in the field of catalysis and material science and has been instrumental in setting up and running the first National Centre for Catalysis Research at IIT Madras. He has authored more than 30 books with top publishers including Springer Publishing, John Wiley & Sons, Elsevier, covering various aspects of material science, catalysis, nanotechnology, Energy, Fuel cells, CO_{2} reduction and has published more than 600 scientific journals. He is considered to be an authority on catalysis and material science in the scientific world and has an H-index of 61 resulting from more than 14,000 citations.

== Early life and education ==
Viswanthan was born in a small village located at the South of India called Kuthanoor in Tanjore district in Tamil Nadu State, India. He received bachelor's and master's degrees in chemistry from St. Joseph's College, Tiruchirappalli, India (1958–1964). He earned his PhD degree at IIT Madras, India, in 1969. He was married to the late Vijayalakshmi Viswanathan and has a son who is a faculty member in the department of mechanical engineering at Carnegie Mellon University, United States.

== Research career ==
Prof. B.V joined Indian Institute of Technology, Madras as an associate lecturer in the chemistry department and moved up the ladder to a full professor in 1990. In addition to full teaching and research activities, he held various key administrative positions like the head of Materials Research Centre for two terms, head of the department of chemistry, 2001–2003, secretary to Graduate Aptitude Test in Engineering (GATE), dean of students (1998–2001), chairman of the Indian Institute of Technology Joint Entrance Examination(IIT-JEE) organizing committee. He has been member of many scientific committees appointed by the government of India in the Department of Science and Technology (India) and Ministry of New and Renewable Energy (MNRE).

== Books authored ==
- Energy Sources: Fundamentals of Chemical Conversion Processes and Applications Balasubramanian Viswanathan, Elsevier, 2017
- Materials and Processes for Solar Fuel Production (Nanostructure Science and Technology), Vaidyanathan Subramanian, Balasubramanian Viswanathan and Jae Sung Lee, Springer; Softcover reprint of the original 1st ed. 2014 edition (23 August 2016).
- Photoelectrochemistry: Principles and Practices, B. Viswanathan and M. Aulice Scibioh, Alpha Science Intl Ltd, 1st Edition (28 February 2014)
- Chemical Engineering: A Comprehensive Approach, Kripal S. Lakhi, B. Viswanathan, Alpha Science Intl Ltd; 1 edition (2 December 2013)
- Catalysts And Surfaces: Characterization Techniques, B. Viswanathan and R. C. Deka, Alpha Science Intl Ltd (30 May 2010)
- Heterogeneous Catalysis, Dipak Kumar Chakrabarty, B. Viswanathan, New Age Science (1 January 2009)
- Fuel Cells: Principles and Applications, B. Viswanathan, M. Aulice Scibioh, CRC Press; 1 edition (24 January 2008)
- Catalysis: Principles and Applications, B. Viswanathan, S. Sivasanker, A. V. Ramaswamy, Narosa Publishing House, 2002
- Chemical and Electrochemcial Energy Systems, R.Narayan and B.Viswanathan, Orient Longmans Ltd. (1997). ISBN 0863117317
