= Harish Viswanathan =

American engineer

Harish Viswanathan from the Bell Labs, Alcatel-Lucent, New Providence, NJ, was named Fellow of the Institute of Electrical and Electronics Engineers (IEEE) in 2013 for contributions to wireless communication systems.

== Education ==
- PhD in Electrical Engineering from Cornell University, 1997
- Master of Science in Electrical Engineering from Cornell University, 1995
- Bachelor of Technology in Electrical Engineering from the Indian Institute of Technology Madras in 1992
