= Pranjivan Vishwanath Thaker =

Diwan of Saurashtra
- In office circa 1890 – circa 1920

Personal details
- Born: c. 1860 Wadhwan, Gujarat, India
- Died: c. 1920 Wadhwan, Gujarat, India

Pranjivan Vishwanath Thaker, (c. 1860 - 1920), was Diwan of Saurashtra, Gujarat, the highest executive office under Rajput rule. He was the brother of Mahashankar Vishwanath Thaker, Chief Treasurer of the princely state of Limbdi.

Today, his descendants have settled, and can largely be found, in the United States of America.

== See also ==
- Watson Museum: for a detailed exhibit on Pranjivan Thaker.
