= Kasi Viswanatha Temple, West Mambalam =

- Kasi Viswanatha Temple, West Mambalam, Chennai, Tamil Nadu

Religion
- Affiliation: Hinduism
- District: Chennai
- Deity: Kasi Viswanathar

Location
- Location: West Mambalam
- State: Tamil Nadu
- Country: India
- Interactive map of Kasi Viswanatha Temple, West Mambalam
- Coordinates: 13°02′09.2″N 80°13′30.7″E

Architecture
- Completed: 17th Century
- Elevation: 54 m (177 ft)

Kasi Viswanatha Temple is a Hindu temple located in the neighbourhood of West Mambalam in Chennai, India. Dedicated to Siva, the temple is named after the Vishwanatha Temple at Varanasi. Constructed in the 17th century, the temple is also known as "Mahabilva Kshetra".

== Location ==
Kasi Viswanatha Temple is located in West Mambalam at an altitude of about 54 m above the mean sea level with the geographic coordinates of 13°02′09.2″N 80°13′30.7″E.

== Kumbhabhishekham ==
In the year 2023, the kumbhabhishekham of this temple was conducted on 2023-09-10, by the Hindu Religious and Charitable Endowments Department of Government of Tamil Nadu.

== See also ==
- Heritage structures in Chennai
- Religion in Chennai
