= Kasi Viswanatha Temple, Ayanavaram =

- Kasi Viswanatha Temple, Ayanavaram, Chennai, Tamil Nadu

Religion
- Affiliation: Hinduism
- District: Chennai
- Deity: Kasi Viswanatha

Location
- Location: Ayanavaram
- State: Tamil Nadu
- Country: India
- Interactive map of Kasi Viswanatha Temple, Ayanavaram
- Coordinates: 13°05′52.8″N 80°14′28.3″E

Architecture
- Elevation: 56 m (184 ft)

Kasi Viswanatha Temple is a Hindu temple in Chennai, India. Located at Konnur high road, Ayanavaram, the temple was constructed by the Tawker clan of Madras' Gujarati community and was constructed during the time of the East India Company. The temple is situated close to the Medavakkam Tank Road and adjoining the Ayanavaram Bus Depot.

This temple is maintained under the control of the Hindu Religious and Charitable Endowments Department of Government of Tamil Nadu.

== Location ==
Kasi Viswanatha Temple is located in Ayanavaram at an altitude of about 56 m above the mean sea level with the geographic coordinates of 13°05′52.8″N 80°14′28.3″E.

== See also ==
- Religion in Chennai
