= Kasi Viswanathar Temple, Umayalpuram =

Shiva temple in Tamil Nadu, India

Kasi Viswanathar Temple is a Hindu temple located at Umayalpuram in the Thanjavur district of Tamil Nadu, India. The temple is dedicated to Shiva.

== Legend ==
According to Hindu mythology, when Shiva accompanied Murugan to Swamimalai in order to obtain the meaning of the Pranava Mantra from him, Shiva asked Uma to stay back. The place where Uma was told to remain got the name Umayalpuram.

The temple is also associated with a Gandharva woman named Vijaya who worshipped Shiva and obtained a darshan of him at this place.

== Shrines ==
The presiding deity is Shiva and the goddess is Kumkuma Sundari. There are shrines to Ganesha, Murugan and Bhairava.
