= History of the Madras Presidency =

Stringer Lawrence, who established the Madras Army, with Mohamed Ali Khan Walajan, the Nawab of Carnatic

Madras Presidency (also known as Madras Province and known officially as Presidency of Fort St. George) was an administrative subdivision (presidency) of British India. At its greatest extent, Madras Presidency included much of southern India, including the present-day Indian State of Tamil Nadu, the Malabar region of North Kerala, Lakshadweep Islands, the Coastal Andhra and Rayalaseema regions of Andhra Pradesh, Undivided Koraput and Ganjam districts of Orissa and the Bellary, Dakshina Kannada, and Udupi districts of Karnataka. The presidency had its capital at Madras (now known as Chennai).

== Establishment ==
In 1684, Madras was once again elevated to the status of a Presidency and William Gyfford appointed the first President. In 1690, the East India Company purchased a promontory from Shahuji I, the [Mahratta Raja of Tanjaore], where they built Fort St. David, near Cuddalore. By 1700, there were English factories at Porto Novo, Madapollam, Vizagapatam, Anjengo, Tellicherry and Calicut.

Although the East India Company managed to keep its distance from the politics of Peninsular India, as struggle involving the Mughals, the Mahrattas, the Nizams of Hyderabad and the Nawabs of the Carnatic, as also the European Companies, until 1740, when repercussion of the War of the Austrian Succession began to be felt in India, as a result of Dupleix's machinations to establish French paramountcy in Southern India. In September 1746, Fort St. George was taken by the French, under La Bourdonnais, and governed as a part of French India until 1749 when Madras was restored to the British under the terms of the Treaty of Aix-la-Chapelle.

In 1755 an expedition was dispatched from Madras to the Tinnevelly country, to assist the Nawab of the Carnatic, to whom it belonged, in bringing it to some order from the poligar chieftains who actually controlled it. Although the polygars were signally defeated the Nawab's representative was unable to exert any control meriting the name, which led the area to being leased to the British by the Nawab. However, in 1763, when Yusuf Khan, the only native commander-in-chief of British troops in India, and the man who had been given charge of Tinnevelly, rebelled and raised the French flag, another expedition was despatched to quell him, after which troops in the area were commanded by British officers and the area administered by native officials on behalf of the Nawab.

When war again broke out between Britain and France in 1757, a campaign was fought between the forces of the two companies all through the extent of the Madras Presidency, from Vizagapatam in the Northern Circars, to Fort St. David, bordering on the Mahratta Kingdom of Tanjore. It was the same war that witnessed the famed Battle of Wandiwash, where the French forces under Count Lally were routed by the English under Sir Eyre Coote. Fort St. Dénis, at Pondicherry, the capital of French India, surrendered to the English in January, 1761. All French possessions were restituted by the provisions of the Peace of Paris of 1763, but the French were ever thereafter a spent force in India.

It was shortly thereafter that the Northern Circars were transferred to the Madras Presidency from the French, who had held it until that point, by the Mughal Emperor. It was in the 1760s that war first broke out between the Madras Presidency and the Kingdom of Mysore under Hyder Ali, but was amicably resolved by a mutual restitution of conquered territories.

In September 1774, by the terms of the Pitt's India Act, which was passed by the British Parliament to regulate the administration of territories owned by the British East India Company and to create an unified authority, the President of Madras was made subordinate to the Governor-General based at Calcutta.

== Expansion ==
In 1780, the First Anglo-Mysore War broke out, which resulted in widespread devastation of the Madras Presidency, by the Mysore troops. Peace was made in 1784 by a mutual restoration of territories. Six years thereafter, in 1790, war again broke out with Mysore, albeit with Tipu Sultan, Hyder Ali's son at its head, when the latter raided the territories of the King of Travancore, an English ally. Assisted by the Nizam of Hyderabad and the Peshwa's forces, in 1792, the Mysorean capital of Seringapatam was besieged by the English, whereupon the Sultan treated for peace, the terms of which were the cession of one half of his territories to the allied forces and an indemnity of 3 crores 30 lakhs of rupees. This resulted in the accession to the Madras Presidency of the territories of Dindigul and the Burramah'l, comprising the country from Salem to Dharmapuri, and Malabar. Seeking revenge, Tipu Sultan began to intrigue with the French, which precipitated the Third Anglo-Mysore War, in 1799. With the assistance of their allies from the previous war the English stormed the Sultan's capital in the Siege of Seringapatam. The conclusion of this war resulted in the addition of Coimbatore and Wayanad and the Canara districts on the West Coast, to the territory of the Madras Presidency.

In addition to these substantial additions, in 1799, the Mahratta Raja of Tanjore ceded his kingdom to the East India Company in return for an annuity, while the Nizam surrendered all territory acquired from Tipu Sultan, to the British, in return for an army in his dominions. This latter accession brought the districts of Bellary, Anantapur, Cuddapah and Kurnool, which were known as the Ceded Districts on account of the circumstances attending upon their accession to the British dominions. The discovery of a body of correspondence between Tipu Sultan and the Nawab of the Carnatic, violative of his alliance with the British, led to a treaty in 1801, whereby the government of his territory of Arcot was resigned to the English, in return for the titular dignity of Prince of Arcot and an annual stipend. Thus, the last quarter of the 18th century was a period of rapid expansion.

In the meanwhile, in 1781, the Nawab of the Carnatic assigned the revenues from the Tinnevelly country to the East India Company. Encouraged by the Dutch, the poligars once again began to prove troublesome. In 1783, a stronghold of the poligar leader Kattabomma Nayak, at Panjalamkurichi was reduced, but the war with Mysore prevented it being followed up. However, by 1799, with the fall of Seringapatam, attention could again be turned to Tinnevelly, which resulted in the capture of Panjalamkurichi and the hanging of Kattabomma Nayak. In 1801, rebellion again broke out, which finally resulted in the area being subdued and the leaders either being hanged or transported. Since the Nawab had already made his territories over to the British, Tinnevelly passed into the Madras Presidency in 1801.

Ceylon, then newly conquered from the Dutch, was a part of the Madras Presidency from 1793 to 1798.

A minor insurrection occurred amongst the sepoy troops at Vellore on 10 July 1806 but was suppressed by the next day using sepoys and European troops from Madras under Captain Rollo Gillespie. This was the only serious military uprising all through British rule, in the Madras Presidency, the territory remaining wholly undisturbed by the Sepoy Mutiny, of 1857.

The kingdom of Mysore was annexed to the Madras Presidency in 1831 on account of inability to pay the exorbitant subsidies to the English East India Company, but the rightful heir was restored as a subsidiary ruler in 1881.

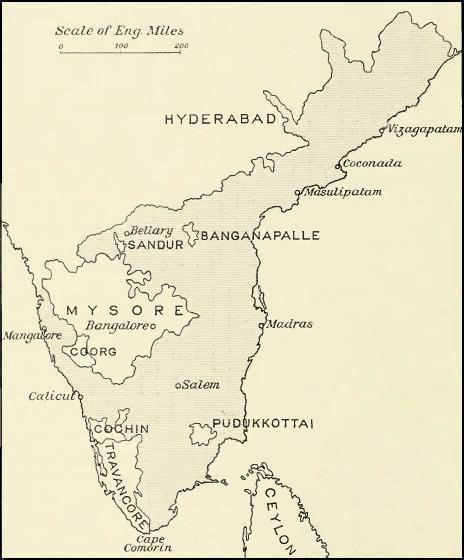
Madras Province in 1913

== The Victorian era ==
Following the Indian Mutiny of 1857, Queen Victoria issued a Proclamation by which Company rule over India came to an end and the British Raj was established. The Victorian era was a period of peace and prosperity. The Indian Councils Act 1861 and the Indian Councils Act 1909 admitted Indians in the provincial administration. There was a rapid increase in the number of educated classes who qualified for the Indian and Provincial Civil Service. The profession of law was especially prized by the newly emerging class of educated Indians. In 1877, T. Muthuswamy Iyer became the first Indian judge of the Madras High Court despite serious opposition. A number of roads, railways, dams and canals were constructed during this time.

During this period, Madras was devastated by two great famines: Great Famine of 1876–78 and the Indian famine of 1896–97. The population of the Presidency fell from 31.2 million in 1871 to 30.8 million in 1881 as a result of the 1876–78 famine.

== Indian Independence Movement and the Home Rule League ==
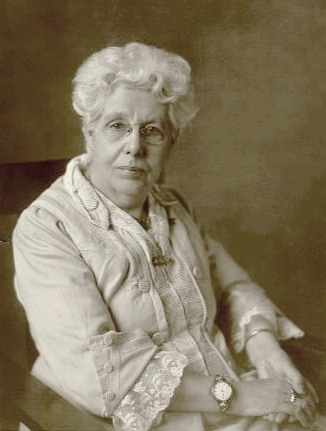
Annie Besant in 1922

There was a strong sense of national awakening in Madras Presidency starting from the later half of the 19th century. Of the 72 delegates who participated in the first session of the Indian National Congress at Bombay in December 1885, 22 were from Madras Presidency. The third session of the Indian National Congress was held in Madras in December 1887 and was a huge success attended by 362 delegates from the Province. Subsequent sessions of the Indian National Congresswere held in Madras in 1894, 1898, 1903, 1908, 1914 and 1927.

The headquarters of the Theosophical Society were moved to Adyar by Madam Blavatsky and Colonel H. S. Olcott in 1882. The most prominent figure associated with the Theosophical Society was Annie Besant who founded the Home Rule League in 1916. The Home Rule Movement was organized from Madras and found extensive support in the Province. The freedom struggle was actively endorsed by nationalistic newspapers such as The Hindu and Swadesamitran and Mathrubhumi. Subramanya Bharathy, Tiruppur Kumaran, V. V. S. Aiyar, Subramanya Siva, V. O. Chidambaram Pillai, Vanchinathan, V. Kalyanasundaram, Chakravarti Rajagopalachari, R. Krishnasamy Naidu, K. Kamaraj, U. Muthuramalingam Thevar, Sir S. Subramania Iyer, G. Subramania Iyer, S. Srinivasa Iyengar, V. S. Srinivasa Sastri, Tanguturi Prakasam, Kala Venkata Rao, Kasinadhuni Nageswara Rao, Bulusu Sambamurti, Sir P. S. Sivaswami Iyer, C. Sankaran Nair, C. Karunakara Menon and Kalki Sadasivam were some prominent freedom-fighters of the period. India's first trade union was established in Madras in 1918 by V. Kalyanasundaram and B. P. Wadia.

== Implementation of the Dyarchy ==
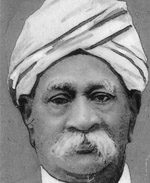
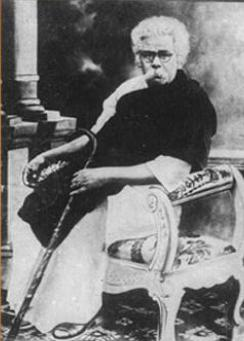
The non-Brahmin movement was started by Sir P. Theagaraya Chetty (left) who founded the Justice Party in 1916. After his death, the movement was spearheaded by E. V. Ramaswamy Naicker (right), affectionately called Periyar, who gave it the much-needed impetus through his social and political work

A dyarchy was created in Madras Presidency in the year 1920 as per the Montagu–Chelmsford Reforms and provisions were made for elections in the Presidency. Democratically elected governments would henceforth share powers with the Governor's autocratic establishment. In the first elections held in November 1920, the Justice Party, an organization that was established in 1916 to campaign for increased representation of non-Brahmins in the administration, was elected to power. A. Subbarayalu Reddiar became the first Chief Minister of Madras Presidency. However, he resigned soon after a short period due to declining health and was replaced with Sir P. Ramarayaningar, the Minister of Local Self-Government and Public Health. The party split in late 1923 when C. R. Reddy resigned from primary membership and formed a splinter group which allied with Swarajists who were in opposition. A no-confidence motion was passed against Ramarayaningar's government on 27 November 1923, which was however defeated 65–44. Ramarayaningar, popularly known as the Raja of Panagal, remained in power till November 1926. The passing of the First communal Government Order (G.O. No.613) which introduced reservations to government jobs, in August 1921, remains one of the highpoints of his rule. In the next elections held in 1926, the Justice Party lost. However, as no party was able to attain clear majority, the Governor set up an independent government under the leadership of P. Subbarayan and nominated members to support it. In 1930, the Justice Party was victorious and P. Munuswamy Naidu became the Chief Minister. However, the exclusion of Zamindars from the Ministry split the Justice Party once again. Fearing a no-confidence motion against him, Munuswamy Naidu resigned in November 1932 and the Raja of Bobbili was appointed Chief Minister. The Justice Party eventually lost in the 1937 elections to the Indian National Congress and Chakravarti Rajagopalachari became Chief Minister of Madras Presidency.

During the 1920s and 1930s, the Anti-Brahmin movement evolved in the Madras Presidency. This movement was launched by a Congressman E. V. Ramaswamy Naicker, who, unhappy with the principles and policies of the Brahmin leadership of the provincial Congress, moved to the Justice Party in 1925. E. V. R., or Periyar, as he was affectionately called, launched venomous attacks on Brahmins, Hinduism and Hindu superstitions in periodicals and newspapers such as Viduthalai and Justice. He also participated in the Vaikom Satyagraha which campaigned for the rights of untouchables in Travancore to enter temples.

== Last days of British rule ==
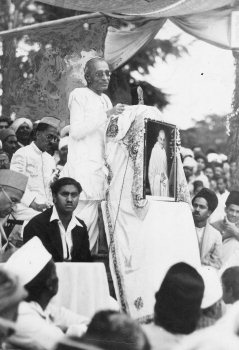
The Indian National Congress came to power for the first time in 1937 with Chakravarti Rajagopalachari (pictured at a rally) as its Chief Minister

The Indian National Congress was elected to power in 1937 for the first time in Madras Presidency and barring the six years when Madras was in a state of Emergency, ruled the Presidency till India got independence on 15 August 1947. Chakravarti Rajagopalachari was the first Chief Minister of Madras Presidency from the Congress party. He issued the Temple Entry Authorization and Indemnity Act and introduced prohibition and sales tax in Madras Presidency. However, his rule is largely remembered for compulsory introduction of Hindi in educational institutions which made him highly unpopular as a politician. This measure sparked off widespread Anti-Hindi agitations even leading to violence in some places. Over 1,200 men, women and children were jailed for participating in these Anti-Hindi agitations. Two agitators Thalamuthu and Natarasan lost their lives. In 1940, the Congress ministers resigned protesting the declaration of war on Germany without their consent and the Governor took over the reins of the administration. The unpopular law was eventually repealed by the Governor on 21 February 1940.

Most of the Congress leadership and erstwhile ministers were arrested in 1942 following their participation in the Quit India Movement. In 1944, Periyar renamed the Justice Party as Dravidar Kazhagam and withdrew from politics. When the Second World War came to an end, the Indian National Congress re-entered politics and without the presence of any serious opposition, was elected to power in the Presidency. However, Chakravarti Rajagopalachari resigned from the party leadership in 1946 facing strong opposition in the party ranks. Tanguturi Prakasam was elected Chief Minister with the support of Kamaraj. He served for 11 months and was succeeded by O. P. Ramaswamy Reddiyar. India became independent on 15 August 1947 with Ramaswamy Reddiyar as the first Chief Minister of Madras State.

== See also ==
- List of colonial Governors and Presidents of Madras
