= K. Gopalan =

Kasturi Gopalan
- Born: 8 November 1890; Coimbatore, Madras Presidency
- Died: 9 December 1974 (aged 84); Madras, Tamil Nadu, India
- Occupation: Publisher
- Spouse: Ranganayaki
- Children: G. Narasimhan, G. Kasturi

Kasturi Gopalan (8 November 1890 – 9 December 1974) was an Indian publisher who founded the publishing company Kasturi & Sons which publishes The Hindu.

== Early life ==
Gopalan was born in Coimbatore on 8 November 1890 to S. Kasturi Ranga Iyengar, a lawyer from Kumbakonam. He was Kasturi Ranga Iyengar's younger son, the elder being K. Srinivasan. He had two children.

== Career ==
While Srinivasan, A. Rangaswami Iyengar and S. Rangaswami Iyengar were involved in editing The Hindu, Gopalan founded and managed Kasturi & Sons—which published the newspaper in addition to journals like Sport and Pastime, Frontline, and Indian Cricket, an annual cricket yearbook.

== Death ==
Gopalan died in December 1974 at the age of 84 after having served as publisher for more than five decades.

== Personal life ==
Gopalan married Ranganayaki and had two sons both of whom served in the board of The Hindu

- G. Narasimhan (1916-1977)
- G. Kasturi (1924-2012)
