= Chinnaswami Rajam =

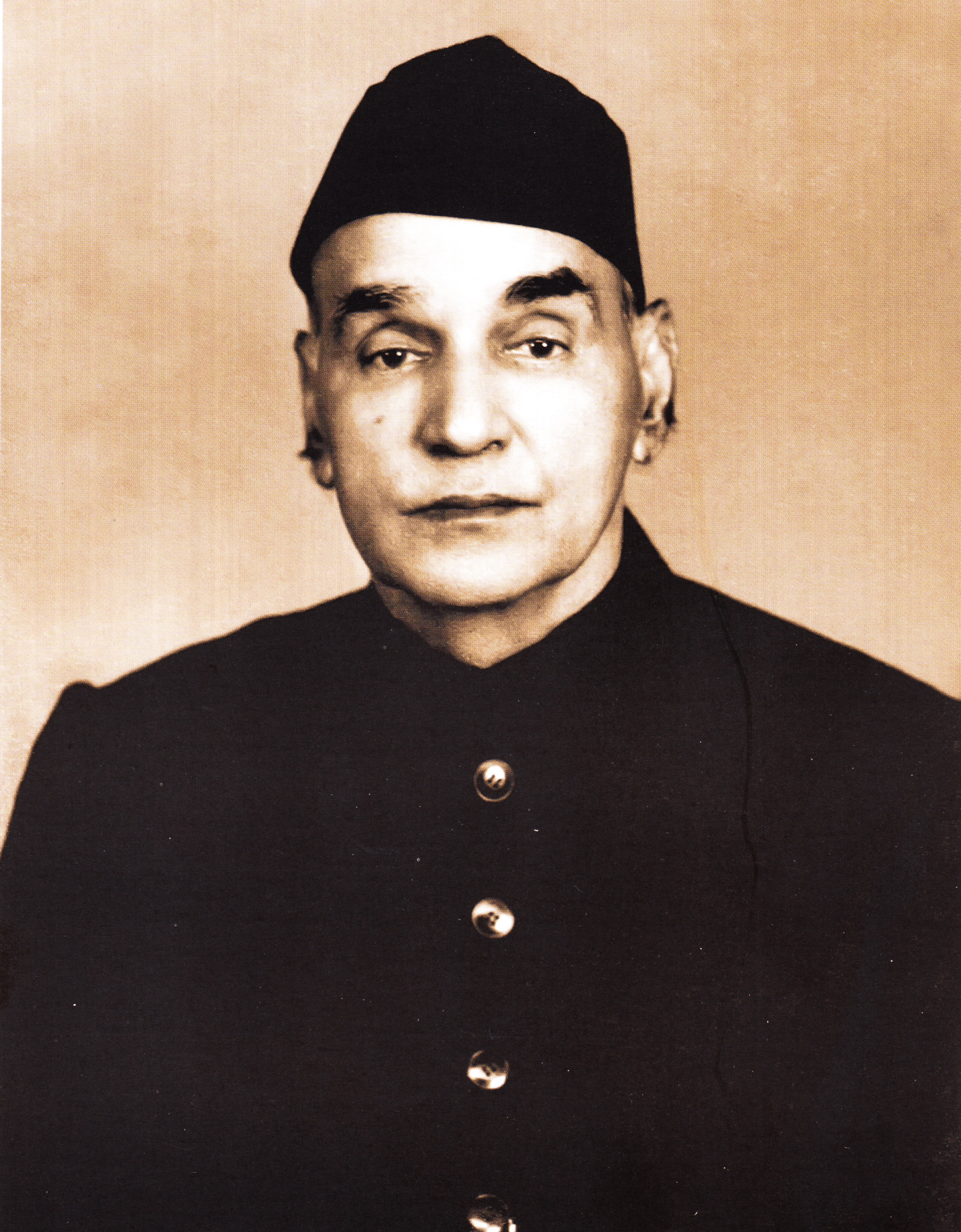
- Born: 28 November 1882; Swamimalai, Thanjavur, Tamil Nadu
- Died: 21 July 1955 (aged 72); Chennai
- Occupations: Entrepreneur, Industrialist
- Known for: Founder of the Madras Institute of Technology

Chinnaswami Rajam (28 November 1882 – 21 July 1955) was a pioneering entrepreneur, eminent industrialist, and the founder of the present Madras Institute of Technology of the Anna University, Chennai. The late Dr. C. P. Ramaswami Iyer called him a "pioneer in the industrial field".

== Early life ==
Chinnaswami Rajam was born in 1882 in the village of Swamimalai, (near Kumbakonam) in Thanjavur District of Madras State (now Tamil Nadu). After completing his high school education at the Town High School, Kumbakonam, he joined the Salem Government Weaving School in 1904 to master the art of weaving process. In the beginning he established a handloom factory (fly shuttle loom) to produce dhotis, towels, shirt material etc., but latter also started trading of consumer items. After not being so successful in those business, he became a volunteer in the congress party and learnt the hardship faced by the mankind. A meeting with Pandit Madan Mohan Malaviya, attracted him towards the philosophical aspects of life.

== As an Industrialist ==
In early 1909, Rajam started the business of leather goods with Mysoor Tanneries with the financial help of his friends, and it was a turning point in his life that lead to his future prosperity. After venturing for nearly five years, he joined Mysore Tanneries as a manager and the company flourished at national and international level where they were dealing with overseas European stores like Whiteway Laidaw & company. In the year 1918, Rajam founded India Company Private Limited with three partners and in the year 1923 this company became the agent of Tata Steel Limited and were trading 2,000 tons of steel per month. This venture turned Rajam into a successful influential business manager in Madras. In the next move Rajam founded the Kumbakonam Electric Supply Corporation Limited in the year 1932 and subsequently in 1933 he started two more companies: Negapatam Electric Supply Company Limited and Indian Steel Rolling Mills Limited. The business in companies proved highly lucrative and Rajam became a leading industrialist in the Madras state. He was the chairman of five companies: India Company Pvt. Ltd., Kumbakonam Electric Supply Corporation Ltd., Negapatam Electric Supply Company Limited, Indian Steel Rolling Mills Limited and Garage Limited. The initial paid up capital of these companies exceeded rupees of 5 million at that time.

== Founding of Madras Institute of Technology ==
Rajam was family oriented and wanted best for his six children, but after the loss of one of his sons and latter wife in 1944, he turned philanthropic. He sold two bungalows for the sum of rupees 0.5 million to acquire the land for the institute: Madras Institute of Technology (MIT). The intention behind to establish a technical institute was driven by the lack of Indian manpower to install and maintain equipment used in those industries. He received assistance from notable personalities such as M. Subbaraya Aiyar, M. K. Ranganthan, K. Srinivasan, C. R. Srinivasan and L. Venkatakrishna Iyer. During a special address at the MIT Alumni Association, the former president of India late Dr. A. P. J. Abdul Kalam described Rajam in his speech as: "He visualized the design, development, maintenance and operation of engineering system should be integrated in the technological field. That is how he worked for founding MIT".

== Recognition by the Prime Minister of India ==
The first prime minister of India Pandit Jawaharlal Nehru’s speech at the first convocation (9 October 1952) of Madras Institute of Technology highlighted the efforts by the founder and his companions: "Anyhow, the most impressive fact of this young and growing institute is that you, having started from small beginnings, are making good progress more with your own efforts, than what you could have if you had an easier time, having all things put before you".

== Death and legacy ==
On 21 July 1955, Chinnaswami Rajam died at the age of 73. Sri Prakasa, Governor, C. Rajagopalachari, Kasturi Srinivasan, C. R. Srinivasan, C. Subramaniam and M. Bhaktavatsalam, among others, offered their condolences to the family at his residence. One of the granddaughter of Rajam, Dr. Prema Srinivasan is a famous author and a regular reviewer of children's books in the newspaper The Hindu.
