= S. Parthasarathy =

Indian journalist

Soundararaja Iyengar Parthasarathy (died 1965) was an Indian journalist who served as editor-in-chief of The Hindu from 1959 to 1965.

== Early life ==
Parthasarathy was born in Madras, British India to civil servant, S. Soundararaja Iyengar. Soundararaja Iyengar was the second son of Sesha Iyengar; he was the younger brother of S. Srinivasa Raghavaiyangar and the elder brother of S. Kasturi Ranga Iyengar. Parthasarathy had his education in Madras and joined The Hindu as sub-editor in September 1924.

== Career ==
Parthasarathy gradually became Assistant Editor and on the death of its chief editor, K. Srinivasan in 1959, became its editor-in-chief with G. Narasimhan as Managing-Director. Parthasarathy served as Chief Editor until his own death in 1965. Parthasarathy was known for his moderate views. During his tenure as editor, the newspaper following a safe path and avoided controversy.

== Death ==
Parthasarathy died in 1965 and was succeeded by G. Kasturi as editor-in-chief.
