= Malini Parthasarathy =

Indian journalist

- Education: Columbia University Graduate School of Journalism, Jawaharlal Nehru University
- Occupations: Chairperson, THG Publishing Private Limited
- Notable credit: The Hindu

Malini Parthasarathy is an Indian journalist, who was an editor of The Hindu during 2015–2016, and also served as chairperson of group's publishing company, THG Publishing Private Limited (formerly part of Kasturi & Sons Limited) from 2020 to 2023.

== Family ==
Malini Parthasarathy is the daughter of Srinivasan Parthasarathy, a granddaughter of Kasturi Srinivasan, and a great-granddaughter of S. Kasturi Ranga Iyengar, who was the patriarch of the Kasturi family that owns The Hindu.

== Education ==
Malini Parthasarathy completed a Ph.D. in 2008 from the Centre for Political Studies, Jawaharlal Nehru University, New Delhi. She has an M.S. in journalism from the Columbia University Graduate School of Journalism and a B.A. in history from Stella Maris College in Chennai. She graduated from the Columbia University Graduate School of Journalism.

== Career ==
She took up various roles in reporting, editorial with The Hindu and served as executive editor of the newspaper until 20 June 2011. Parthasarathy became the editor of the paper on 21 October 2013. She also founded The Hindu Centre for Politics and Public Policy.

Malini Parthasarathy was appointed as the Editor of The Hindu on 1 February 2015. She later stepped down after eleven months of being an editor. In an email to employees, Parthasarathy said she was forced to resign following the feedback she received on her performance as editor. Parthasarathy’s tenure as the editor of the paper has been eventful, and has seen many high-profile journalists exit on not-very-cordial terms.

Malini Parthasarathy was appointed Chairperson of the Board of Directors of The Hindu Group Publishing Private Limited on 15 July 2020. She succeeded N. Ram, who stepped down as Chairman of the Board of Directors on attaining the age of 75. On 5 June 2023, she resigned from board of The Hindu Group Publishing Private Limited.

The Columbia Journalism School named her as one of the recipients of the 2022 Alumni awards. In a statement, the School said, "the award is presented every year to distinguished graduates who exemplify the best of the Journalism School's high standards of journalism."

During her tenure as the editor of the newspaper, she launched the Mumbai edition of The Hindu on 28 November 2015. Since 2004, she is a member of the governing board of the Auroville Foundation.

In December 2024, Parthasarathy was appointed as a Visiting Professor at the Centre of International Politics, Organisation & Disarmament, School of International Studies, Jawaharlal Nehru University.
