= M. Veeraraghavachariar =

Indian journalist, freedom-fighter and teacher (1857 - 1906)

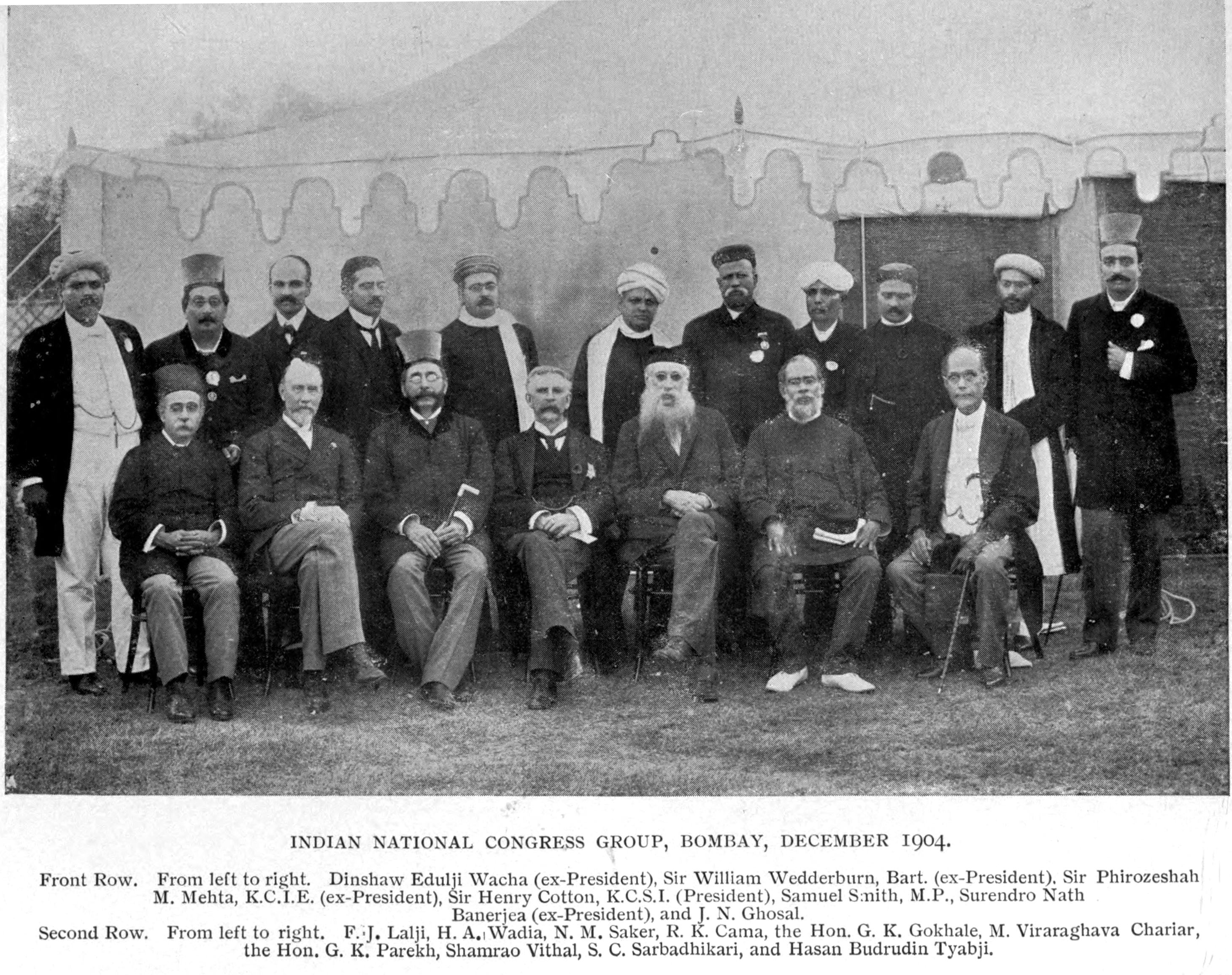
INDIAN NATIONAL CONGRESS GROUP, BOMBAY, DECEMBER 1904. Front Row. From left to right. Dinshaw Edulji Wacha (ex-President). Sir William Wedderburn. Bart. (ex-President). Sir Phirozeshah M. Mehta, KX.I.E. (ex-President). Sir Henry Cotton. K.C.S.1. (President). Samuel Smith, M.P., Surendro Nath Banerjea (ex-President), and J. N. Ghosal. Second Row. From left to right. F..J. Lalji, H A. Wadia. N M. Saker. K. R. Cama. the Hon. (G K. Gokhale, M. Viraraghava Chariar. the Hon. G. K. Parekh, Shamrao Vittal, S. C. Sarbadhikari, and Hasan Budrudin Tyabji

Mudumbai Veeraraghavachariar (1857–1906) was an Indian journalist, freedom-fighter and teacher from the erstwhile Madras Presidency. He was one of the founding Triplicane Six of The Hindu newspaper and served as its managing director from 1878 to 1905.

== Early life ==
Veeraraghavachariar was born in a Vaishnavite Brahmin family of Vadakapattu village near Chingleput. He had his schooling and graduation in Madras. On graduating, he was employed as a lecturer in Pachaiyappa's College, Madras. At about this time, he befriended fellow tutor, G. Subramania Iyer.

== Founding of The Hindu ==
In 1878, 21-year-old Veeraraghavachariar and four of his friends, G. Subramania Iyer, T. Rangachari, P. V. Rangachariar, D. Kesava Rao Pantulu and N. Subba Rao Pantulu, who later became popular in history as the Triplicane Six, founded the English-language newspaper, The Hindu. While Veeraraghavachariar and Subramania Iyer were lecturers at the college, the rest were all students.

== With The Hindu ==
Soon after its founding, most of the Triplicane Six parted ways to practice as lawyers. Chief-editor Subramania Iyer and Managing Director Veeraraghavachariar were the only ones who remained. Subramania Iyer took a bold stand and questioned British colonial rule as well as Hindu orthodoxy. Veeraraghavachariar, on the contrary, was a moderate and opposed Subramania Iyer's militant views. The difference in ideologies caused a rift between the two. This rift was further compounded when Veeraraghavachariar lashed out at Iyer's friend Eardley Norton in some of The Hindu 's editorials. Subramania Iyer's revolutionary views on Hindu society proved detrimental to the newspaper and soon it began to decline landing its owners in dire financial straits.

In 1898, G. Subramania Iyer left The Hindu and took over the management of the Swadesamitran. Left alone, Veeraraghavachariar employed C. Karunakara Menon as the Chief-Editor and tried to convert the newspaper into a joint-stock company in 1901. The plan failed landing the newspaper in heavy debt. In a special edition commemorating its twentyfifth anniversary, Veeraraghavachariar noted that the newspaper had defended four libel suits since its founding and lost three. Faced with a crisis, Veeraraghachariar sold the newspaper in 1904-05. The paper was purchased by S. Kasturi Ranga Iyengar in April 1905.

== Later years ==
Veeraraghavachariar died in 1906 at the age of 47.
