= Town Higher Secondary School =

School in Kumbakonam, Tamil Nadu, India

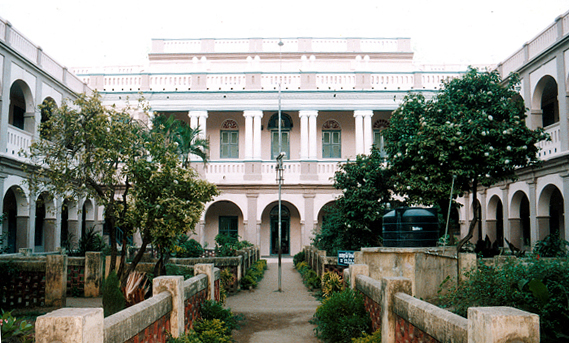
Kumbakonam, Town Higher Secondary School's Front View.

Town Higher Secondary School is a school in Kumbakonam, a town in the Thanjavur district in the Indian state of Tamil Nadu.

== History ==
This school was founded as a primary school on 14 April 1864 by Martin, a retired English head constable at the Bhagavath Padithurai Mandapam. Many people, including Ragunathaswami Rao, Rao Bhagadhur T. Gopal Rao and Gopu Subburaya Chettiar played a pivotal role in the growth of the school. The Chairman of Kumbakonam Municipality, Shri. P. Thambusamy Mudaliar offered his plantain grove of 100,800 square feet for the school, at a low price. The foundation stone for the main building was laid by Porter on 29 December 1881.

In 1885, the two houses in which the school had functioned were sold at the cost of Rs. 10,500. In 1887, a committee that consisted P. Thambusamy Mudaliar, A.C. Narayana Iyer and V. Krishna Iyer was formed to supervise the construction of the school building. Taking a school which was in Pondicherry as a model, this school was constructed in 1891 at the cost of Rs. 58,000. In 1892, the building was opened by Dr. Duncan, Director of School Education.

Since its inception, the institution was always run by a group of people belonging to Kumbakonam town. It is today an aided institution of the Government of Tamil Nadu. The motto of this school is 'TRUTH, HONOUR, SERVICE AND SACRIFICE'.

In July 1978, the school was upgraded to a higher secondary school. K. Baladandayuthapani is the current secretary and correspondent of the school while R. Raman is the headmaster. The school releases a bimonthly magazine called HARMONY to develop the writing skills of the students in English. It also has an English Literary Club.

In January 2014, the school celebrated its 150th year.

- Srinivasa Ramanujan, mathematician
- T. T. Krishnamachari, the former finance minister of India
- T. V. Sadasiva Pandarathar, famous Historian
- Umayalpuram K. Sivaraman, famous mridangam player. He received Padma Vibhushan and doctorate awards.
- Maharajapuram Santhanam, famous carnatic musician. He received Sangeetha Kalanidhi award from Madras Music Academy and Padma Sri award from Government of India.
- Shiv Nadar, founder and chairman of HCL Technologies
- S. Kasturi Ranga Iyengar, the pioneer editor and proprietor of The Hindu
- L. Venkatakrishna Iyer, civil engineer and Padma Bhushan recipient
- Indra Parthasarathy, famous Tamil writer
