= C. R. Srinivasan =

Indian journalist (1889–1962)

- Born: 28 November 1889
- Died: 29 January 1962 (aged 72); Madras, India
- Occupation: journalist
- Known for: journalism, banking expertise
- Children: C. S. Narasimhan

C. R. Srinivasan (28 November 1889 – 29 January 1962) was an Indian journalist who served as Managing Director of the Tamil language newspaper Swadesamitran from 1934 to 1962.

== Early career ==
Born on 28 November 1889, Srinivasan graduated from the Presidency College, Madras in 1910 and joined Swadesamitran, a newspaper run by his maternal uncle, A. Rangaswami Iyengar as Manager and Assistant Editor in 1915. When Rangaswami Iyengar moved over to The Hindu in 1928, Srinivasan became the editor of the newspaper. He also became the managing director in 1934.

== Death ==
Srinivasan died on 29 January 1962 at the age of seventy-two. He was succeeded as managing director by his son, C. S. Narasimhan.
