= Chromepet Flyover =

Bridge in India

Coordinates: 12.946936°N 80.137072°E

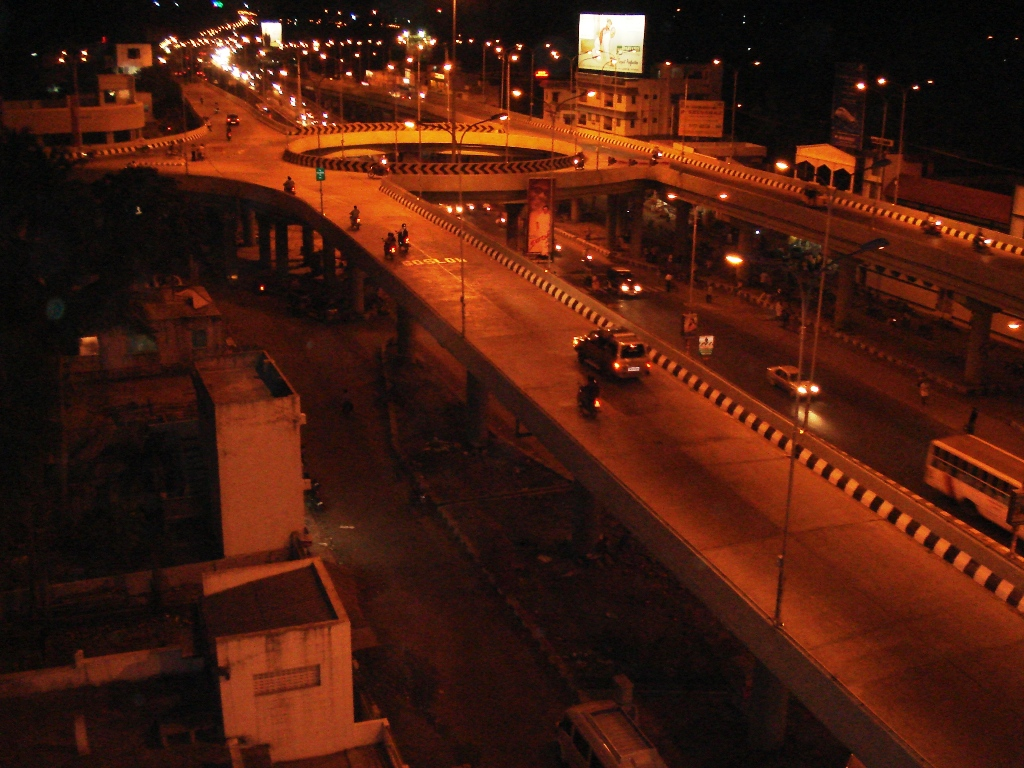
Chrompet Flyover

The Chrompet Flyover is an elevated rotary type interchange flyover that connects GST road (NH 45) with the Madras Institute of Technology gate in Chennai, India.
