= L. Venkatakrishna Iyer =

Indian civil engineer

- Born: India
- Died: India
- Occupation: Civil engineer
- Known for: Polavaram Project
- Awards: Padma Bhushan

Lakshminarayana Aiyer Venkatakrishna Iyer was an Indian civil engineer and the Chief Engineer of the Public Works Department of the state of Tamil Nadu. It was Iyer who did the survey and submitted the initial proposal for building a reservoir across Godavari River near Polavaram in 1941 which was later commissioned as Polavaram Project. An alumnus of the Town Higher Secondary School, Kumbakonam, he was among the few who assisted Chinnaswami Rajam in founding Madras Institute of Technology (MIT) and sat on the core committee which oversaw the establishment of the institution. The government of India awarded him the third highest civilian honour of the Padma Bhushan, in 1961, for his contributions to society.

== See also ==
- Chinnaswami Rajam
- Town Higher Secondary School
- Polavaram Project
