= Vasandhathil Or Naal =

1982 film by A. C. Tirulokchandar

- Theatrical release poster
- Directed by: A. C. Tirulokchandar
- Story by: Gulzar
- Produced by: S. Rangarajan
- Starring: Sivaji Ganesan; Sripriya
- Cinematography: Viswanath Rai
- Music by: M. S. Viswanathan
- Production company: Venus Arts
- Release date: 7 May 1982
- Country: India
- Language: Tamil

Vasandhathil Or Naal (transl. A day in spring) is a 1982 Indian Tamil-language film, directed by A. C. Tirulokchandar and produced by S. Rangarajan. The film stars Sivaji Ganesan and Sripriya. It is a remake of the 1975 Hindi film Mausam. The film was released on 7 May 1982.

== Plot ==
Rajasekaran visits a village and falls in love with Raji. He promises her that he would go back to town, get his parents' approval and come back to marry her. However, circumstances alter and he is unable to fulfil his promise. Years pass and he hopes that she has married someone else and leads a peaceful life until he accidentally meets her in a brothel.

Turns out that the girl he saw there was not Raji but Neela, Raji's daughter. He buys her from the brothel and takes her to his home and tries to reform her. He finds out that Raji was forced to marry a crippled old man, raped by her brother-in-law, died of insanity while leaving Neela as a child who in turn was abused by the same brother-in-law and later sold to a brothel. Rajasekaran feels guilty and strives to redeem her.

Neela mistakes this for love and attempts to romance Rajasekaran who tells her the whole truth. She hates Rajasekarana and flees. After some convincing by the brothel madame and Rajasekaran accepting his guilt instead of defending himself, she chooses to forgive and he adopts her as his daughter.

== Cast ==
- Sivaji Ganesan as Rajasekaran
- Sripriya as Neela / Raji
- V. K. Ramasamy as Neela's father
- Manorama as Ponnamma, Brothel Madame
- Thengai Srinivasan as Minor
- S. Rama Rao as Alwar, Rajasekaran's servant

== Soundtrack ==
The soundtrack was composed by M. S. Viswanathan, with lyrics by Kannadasan.

Track listing
No.	Title	Singer(s)	Length
1.	"Pachai Vanna"	S. P. Balasubrahmanyam, Vani Jairam	4:10
2.	"Podhum Deivam"	T. M. Soundararajan	4:18
3.	"Kuala Lumpur"	L. R. Eswari	4:31
4.	"Vendum Vendum"	S. P. Balasubrahmanyam, Vani Jairam	4:33
Total length:			17:32

== Release and reception ==
Vasandhathil Or Naal was released on 7 May 1982. S. Shivakumar of Mid-Day appreciated Sripriya for giving a "remarkably studied performance" and that she "sometimes steals scenes from the great thespian himself". Manjula Ramesh of Kalki felt Ganesan and Sripriya were wasted in this weightless plot but praised the cinematography and musical score. S. Jayakrishnan, writing for New Sunday Times, praised the performances of Ganesan and Sripriya, but criticised the director for "bogging down the movie in its initial stages with trivia", while appreciating the technical aspects such as photography.
