= Subramania Iyer =

Subramania Iyer may refer to:

- G. Subramania Iyer (1855–1916), founder of The Hindu English language Indian newspaper.
- S. Subramania Iyer, Indian judge and founder of the Home Rule League.
