= Prema Srinivasan =

Indian author (c. 1932 – 2022)

== Biography ==
Srinivasan holds a Ph.D. in children's literature in English. A published credit of Prema Srinivasan is Children's Fiction in English in India, Trends and Motifs published in 1998 by TR Publications.

Srinivasan is a regular reviewer of children's books in The Hindu, which is a leading national daily in India. She has written a novel for children, Treasure Hunters, published in the "Young World Supplement" of The Hindu.

Among her other works, she translated Australian author Libby Hathorn's Thunderwith into Tamil called Idiyosai, published by Palaniappa Bros in 2001. Her latest translation work, in the Tamil Language is Madarasil Mridu, or Mridu in Madras written by Vasantha Surya in English.

Srinivasan's travelogue (2009), "Footloose and Fancy-Free", is an anthology of travel tales. It has been reviewed in The Hindu.

Her publication, A Visionary's Reach, was released by Sri A.P.J. Abdul Kalam (a former President of India) on 7 January 2014 at the Madras Institute of Technology (now a part of Anna University, Chennai). The book traces the life story of Chinnaswami Rajam (Srinivasan's grandfather), who established this institute of technology by selling his palatial mansion, the India House, in 1949. The book had several contributors including Sri Abdul Kalam. Prema Srinivasan who authored the preface, epilogue and first chapter, dedicated the book to the memory of her father.
