= Gopalan Kasturi =

Indian newspaper editor (1924–2012)

- Born: 17 December 1924; Madras, British India
- Died: 21 September 2012 (aged 87); Chennai, India
- Occupation: journalist
- Known for: journalism

Gopalan Kasturi (17 December 1924 – 21 September 2012) was an Indian journalist who was the editor of The Hindu from 1965 to 1991. He was a grandson of S. Kasturi Ranga Iyengar, of the family that owns The Hindu. Kasturi became the editor of the newspaper after the death of his uncle S. Parthasarathy. Kasturi was the longest serving editor of the newspaper.

== Personal life ==
Kasturi was born in Madras on 17 December 1924 to K. Gopalan and Ranganayaki. He was the grandson of S. Kasturi Ranga Iyengar, the patriarch of the Kasturi family, who died a year before he was born. Kasturi graduated from the Presidency College, Madras and joined The Hindu, the family newspaper.

Kasturi married Kamala and has two sons and a daughter - K. Balaji, K. Venugopal and Lakshmi Srinath. Kasturi's elder brother, G. Narasimhan, served as Managing-Director of The Hindu from 1959 to 1977.

== Editorship ==
Kasturi became the Editor of The Hindu in 1965 on the early death of its editor, S. Parthasarathy. Kasturi served as its editor from 1965 to 1991. Kasturi retired in 1991 and was succeeded by N. Ravi.

== Death ==
Kasturi died on 21 September 2012 at the age of 88 at his home in Chennai.
