= S. Rangarajan =

Indian journalist, entrepreneur, cricketer, film producer and socialite

- Born: Srinivasan Rangarajan; 10 April 1936; Chennai, Tamil Nadu
- Died: 8 February 2007 (aged 70)
- Occupations: journalist, film producer

Srinivasan Rangarajan (10 April 1936 – 8 February 2007) was an Indian journalist, entrepreneur, cricketer, film producer and socialite. He is the youngest son of K. Srinivasan and grandson of S. Kasturi Ranga Iyengar.

== Early life ==
Rangarajan was born in Madras to K. Srinivasan, editor and managing director of The Hindu on 10 April 1936. He studied in Madras and became a director in The Hindu in 1958.

== As film producer ==
- Gauravam (1973)
- Vasandhathil Oru Naal (1981)
- Kanmaniye Pesu (1985)
- Lakshmi Vandhachu (1986)
- Ore Oru Gramathiley (1987)
