= Eardley Norton =

Indian politician (1852–1931)

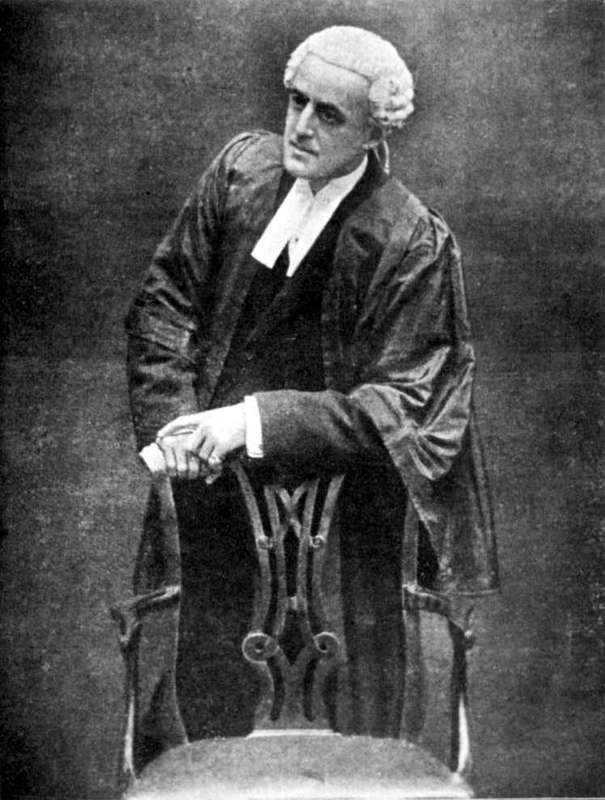
- Photograph of Eardley Norton

Member of the Imperial Legislative Council
- In office 1894–1894

Personal details
- Born: Eardley John Norton; 19 February 1852 Madras Presidency, India
- Died: 13 July 1931 (aged 79) Bexley, Kent, England
- Party: Indian National Congress (1887-1895)
- Education: Merton College, Oxford

Eardley John Norton (19 February 1852 – 13 July 1931) was a Madras barrister, coroner and politician of British origin. He was also one of the earliest members of the Indian National Congress and a champion of civil liberties and rights of the Indian people.

== Early life ==
Eardley was born in India in 1852, the eldest son of lawyer John Bruce Norton, who had served as Advocate-General of Madras. He received his education in Rugby School, England. He matriculated on 15 October 1870 at the age of 18 and graduated in arts from Merton College, Oxford. He read law at Lincoln's Inn and was called to the bar in 1876. In 1879, he set sail to India to practice in the Madras High Court.

== Practice in Madras ==
Eardley Norton practised as a lawyer in Madras from 1879 to 1906. Norton was elected to the Imperial Legislative Council (India) in 1894 but had to resign within a month due to an adultery suit against him.

In 1897, a furor was raised over the appointment of a lawyer V. Bhashyam Aiyangar as Advocate-General of the Presidency. Norton suggested that it was better to seek the opinion of the Bombay Bar over it and his suggestion was implemented.

Norton was a close friend of G. Subramania Iyer, who founded The Hindu. He wrote a column in The Hindu called "Olla Podrida" under the pseudonym Sentinel. This column ran from May 1889 to December 1889. Norton started the Indian Aluminium Company for the manufacture of utensils in 1900.

== Indian National Congress ==
Norton was associated with the Indian National Congress for about seven years from 1887 to early 1895. He participated in the 1887 session at Madras in the course of which he made a much acclaimed speech defending his support for Indian nationalists and association with the Congress. He gave a magnificent garden party for the visiting dignitaries, as did the Governor Lord Connemara at Government House and the sheriff of Madras, S. Ramaswami Mudaliar. Norton attended the Allahabad Congress of 1888 and moved a resolution for simultaneous Civil Service examinations in England and India.

He campaigned in England along with Dadabhai Naoroji and W. C. Bonnerjee for greater political rights for Indians and there they enlisted the support of Charles Bradlaugh, Liberal Member of British Parliament for Northampton. The three said Congressmen, along with William Digby created a UK chapter of the Indian National Congress.

The UK-wing, known as the British Committee of the Indian National Congress, was established in July 1889 under the leadership of Bradlaugh, who was accorded the title "Member for India".

Norton was also part of the Congress' first deputation to England in 1889. He attended the Bombay Congress of 1889 which came to be popularly called 'Bradlaugh Congress' because Bradlaugh attended it. In that Congress, he introduced the Madras scheme for reform of the Indian Legislative Councils and that scheme, due mainly to the efforts put by Bradlaugh and the Indian Congressmen, metamorphosed into the Indian Councils Act 1892. He participated in the tenth session of the Indian National Congress held in Madras in 1894.

The scandal of his affair with a married woman, whom he married after her divorce from her husband, wrecked his political career. After resignation from the Congress in 1895, he only attended one further Congress, the Madras Congress held in 1903.

== Death ==
Eardley died on 13 July 1931, aged 79, at Bexley, Kent.

== Legacy ==
Norton lived in Dunmore House in Alwarpet, Madras. He moved to Calcutta in 1906.

When he was called a 'veiled seditionist' for his association with the Indian National Congress, he responded to the charge in a hard-hitting speech in the Madras Congress of 1887:

If it be sedition, gentlemen, to rebel against all wrong, if it be sedition to insist that the people should have a fair share in the administration of their own country and affairs, if it be sedition to resist class tyranny, to raise my voice against oppression, to mutiny against injustice, to insist upon a hearing before sentence, to uphold the liberties of the individual, to vindicate our common right to gradual but ever advancing reform – if this be sedition. I am right glad to be called a seditionist; and doubly, aye trebly, glad when I look around me today to know and feel I am ranked as one among such a magnificent array of seditionists
