= Ganga (actor) =

Indian actor (1960–2023)

- Born: 1960
- Died: 10 November 2023 (aged 62–63); Chidambaram, India
- Occupation: Actor
- Years active: 1982-2002

Ganga (1960 – 10 November 2023) was an Indian actor who appeared in Tamil language films as a leading and supporting actor.

== Career ==
Ganga made his acting debut through Kadavulukku Oru Kaditham (1982), portraying a supporting role. His career breakthrough came through T. Rajender's romantic drama Uyirullavarai Usha (1983), where he portrayed a lead role alongside Rajender and Saritha. The film won critical acclaim upon release, and performed well at the box office. In the mid-1980s, Ganga continued to take on a mix of lead and supporting roles in the Tamil film industry. Other notable films that he proceeded to work on included Karaiyai Thodatha Alaigal (1985), Lakshmi Vandhachu (1986) and Meendum Savithri (1996).

== Death ==
Ganga died on 10 November 2023 aged 63 after suffering a cardiac arrest. Ganga did not marry and lived with his brother's family until his death.

== Filmography ==
=== Films ===
- Kadavulukku Oru Kaditham (1982)
- Uyirullavarai Usha (1983)
- Karaiyai Thodatha Alaigal (1985)
- Lakshmi Vandhachu (1986)
- Kalamellam Un Madiyil (1986)
- Kanmaniye Pesu (1986)
- Veedu Manaivi Makkal (1988)
- Thangamana Raasa (1989)
- Murugane Thunai (1990)
- Meendum Savithri (1996)
- Kadhal Azhivathillai (2002)

=== Television ===
- Nambikkai (Sun TV)
