= N. Subba Rao Pantulu =

Indian politician and social activist (1856-1941)

Nyapathi Subba Rao Pantulu
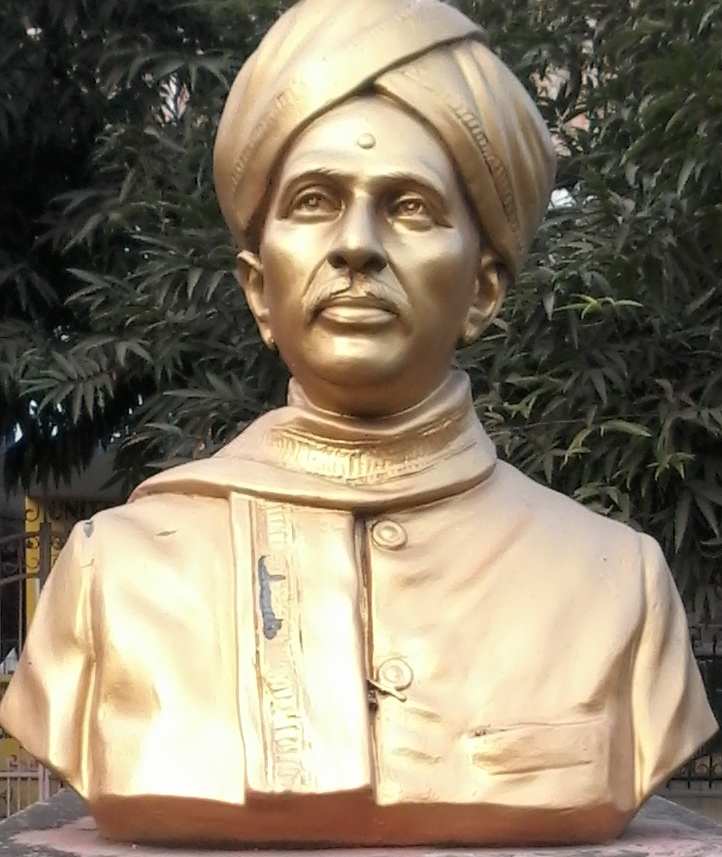
- Statue of Nyapati Subba Rao Pantulu at Freedom Fighters' Park, Rajahmundry
- Born: 14 January 1856; Nellore, Madras Presidency, British India
- Died: 15 January 1941 (aged 85)
- Education: Madras Christian College
- Known for: Indian freedom movement, Founding member of The Hindu (Triplicane Six), Mylapore clique
- Title: Member of Legislative Council
- Term: 1893-1909
- Political party: Indian National Congress

Nyapathi Subba Rao Pantulu (popularly known as Andhra Bhishma) (14 January 1856 – 15 January 1941) was an Indian politician and social activist who served as a member of the Madras Legislative Council between 1893 and 1909. He was also one of the Triplicane Six, founders of The Hindu, and General Secretary of the Indian National Congress from 1914 to 1917.

== Early life ==
Pantulu was born in a Telugu-speaking Deshastha Madhva Brahmin family in Nellore on 14 January 1856, but later moved to Rajahmundry. His father Veera Raghava Rao worked in the Customs Department (Salt Branch) in the Madras Government. His mother was Rangamma. As a student, Subba Rao was known for his intelligence and industry. After passing the Matriculation examination, he joined the Christian College at Madras and obtained his B.A degree in 1876. Three years later, he obtained his law degree. After qualifying for the Bar, he set up his practice at Rajahmundry in 1880. At Rajahmundry, he came into contact with Kandukuri Veeresalingam, the well known Andhra social reformer. Subba Rao was attracted by the literary and social reform activities of Veeresalingam. Within a few years Subba Rao became a leading lawyer in Rajahmundry.

== Literary Interests ==
Subba Rao was interested in journalism and Telugu literature. While studying in Madras, he founded The Hindu in 1878 along with his friends G. Subramania Iyer and M. Veeraraghavachariar. He also founded two other journals : Chintamani in Telugu and Indian Progress in English. Chintamani encouraged the writing of Telugu novels by instituting annual awards.

== Political activities ==
Pantulu was involved in politics from his early life, and aligned with the Mylapore clique. He served as the first Chairman of the Rajahmundry municipality. He attended the first session of the Indian National Congress held at Bombay in 1885. In 1892, he was elected as a member of the Madras Legislative Council. In 1894, he presided over the annual session of the Krishna District Association. In the following year he established the Godavari District Association. He presided over the annual session of the Madras Provincial Conference held at Visakhapatnam on 5 June 1907.

== Indian Independence Movement ==
Subbarao was a moderate by conviction. He did not support the activists of the extremists. At the same time, he supported the Swadeshi Movement as it fostered the growth of indigenous industries. Along with C.Y. Chintamani he toured the coastal Andhra districts to propagate Swadeshi. Pantulu was elected as the General Secretary of the Indian National Congress in 1914 and remained in that position till 1917. When the Andhra Mahasabha held its second session at Vijayawada on 11 April 1914, Pantulu presided over the meeting in which he demanded a separate Andhra state for Telugu-speaking people of Madras Presidency. This resulted in the formation of the Andhra Congress Council on 22 January 1918 with Pantulu as its first President and Konda Venkatappayya as its Secretary.

== Death ==
Pantulu died in late 1940 at the age of 84. In a tribute which appeared in The Hindu in January 1941, Pantulu was hailed as "a man of magnificent vitality" and "a promoter of 'liberal Hinduism'".
