= Lakshmi Vandhachu =

- Theatrical release poster
- Directed by: Rajasekhar
- Story by: D. N. Mukherjee
- Produced by: S. Rangarajan
- Starring: Sivaji Ganesan; Padmini; Revathi
- Cinematography: Ranga
- Edited by: C. Lancy; R. Vittal
- Music by: Raveendran
- Production company: Aries Cine Arts
- Distributed by: Alamu Movies
- Release date: 1 November 1986
- Country: India
- Language: Tamil

Lakshmi Vandhachu (transl. Lakshmi has come) is a 1986 Indian Tamil-language comedy drama film directed by Rajasekhar. The film stars Revathi in the title role along with Sivaji Ganesan and Padmini. It is a remake of the 1980 Hindi film Khubsoorat. The film was released on 1 November 1986.

== Plot ==
Rajeshwari is the strict disciplinarian of the family that keeps everyone under her control – particularly her husband Rajasekhar. Her four sons live by her rules without question. When her second son marries, his new wife's younger sister Lakshmi comes to stay with the family. Lakshmi's carefree and easy-going attitude endears her to the family but puts her at odds with Rajeshwari. Raja, the family's third son and Lakshmi also fall in love. One of Lakshmi's pranks pushes Rajeshwari to her limit and creates fissures in the family. A crisis eventually sets things in motion to solve all the problems.

== Cast ==
- Sivaji Ganesan as Rajasekhar
- Padmini as Rajeshwari
- Revathi as Lakshmi
- Nizhalgal Ravi as Raja
- Haja Sheriff as Jagan
- V. K. Ramasamy as Ramanathan
- Jayachitra as Chithra
- Senthil as Renga
- Chinni Jayanth as Gilbert
- Kovai Sarala as Valli
- Ganga as Sarasu
- S. Ve. Shekher as Shekhar
- Meena as Meena
- Ra. Sankaran as Mudhaliar

== Soundtrack ==
Soundtrack was composed by Raveendran.

Song	Singers	Length
"Kaalam Kanindhadhu"	K. S. Chithra	03:27
"Sandhana Nilavoli"	Malaysia Vasudevan	03:43
"Ellorum Thedum"	S. P. Sailaja	03:44
"Naan Aanaiyittal"	S. Janaki, Sampathkumar	03:26
"Kadhal Vennila"	S. Janaki	04:30

== Critical reception ==
T. S. V. Hari of The Indian Express wrote, "To such a goody goody tale, the Tamil version adds its own brand of gutter humour, which instead of tickling the ribs, leaves wounds on the sides". Jayamanmadhan of Kalki wrote Revathi has chirpiness, Padmini has sparkle, and Ganesan has variety, but it seems an elephant sized injection should be given to make the screenplay active. Balumani of Anna praised the acting, humour, music, cinematography and direction.
