= Kasturi Balaji =

Indian journalist and publisher

Kasturi Balaji (born 1955) is an Indian journalist and publisher who is the Managing Director of The Hindu since 20 March 2010.

== Early life ==
Balaji was born in 1955 to G. Kasturi and his wife, Kamala. He graduated in commerce from the Loyola College, Chennai and MBA from the University of Bombay.

== Career ==
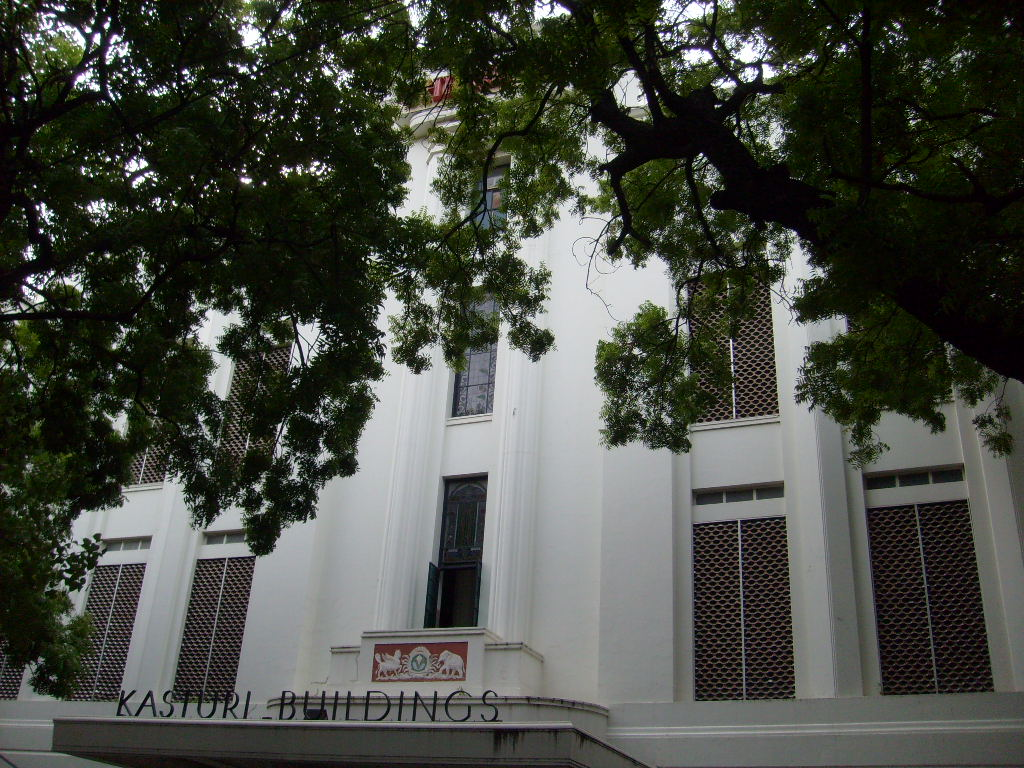
The Hindu office in Chennai, where Balaji is Editor

Balaji joined The Hindu in 1977 and till 1991, he was associated with newspaper and magazine production. He was instrumental in setting up an ink manufacturing plant.

From 1991 to 2000, Balaji served as Managing Director of Sanka Graphics Pvt Ltd and from 2000 to 2010, he was director of Kasturi and Sons Ltd, which published The Hindu. He is in-charge of production, EDP, accounts and circulation.
