= S. Rangaswami Iyengar =

Srinivasa Raghavaiyangar Rangaswami Iyengar
- Born: 6 January 1887; Madras, British India
- Died: 10 October 1926 (aged 39); Madras, British India
- Occupations: Lawyer; journalist
- Known for: Journalism

Srinivasa Raghavaiyangar Rangaswami Iyengar (6 January 1887 – 23 October 1926) was an Indian lawyer and journalist who served as the editor of The Hindu from 1923 till his own death in 1926. He was the son of S. Srinivasa Raghavaiyangar and nephew of S. Kasturi Ranga Iyengar.

== Early life and education ==
Rangaswami was born to civil servant S. Srinivasa Raghavaiyangar on 6 January 1887. Raghavaiyangar served as Inspector General of Registration in the Madras Presidency and later, Diwan of Baroda. Rangaswami was Raghavaiyangar's fourth son. His uncle was the journalist S. Kasturi Ranga Iyengar, founder of Kasturi and Sons.

Rangaswami completed his matriculation in 1903 at the age of sixteen and graduated in law. After practising as a lawyer for sometime, Rangaswami joined The Hindu as Assistant Editor in 1910.

== Career ==
Rangaswami came into limelight through his accounts of the battles of the First World War. Towards the end of the 1910s, Rangaswami became more aggressive and began targeting the British administrations and loyalist. He was particularly critical of V. S. Srinivasa Sastri who he described as "the pet lamb of the British government". He was also, at the same time, sharply critical of Mahatma Gandhi.

Following Kasturi Ranga Iyengar's death in 1923, Rangaswami took over as editor with K. Srinivasan as managing director and served till October 1926.

== Death ==
Rangaswami Iyengar died on 23 October 1926 due to an unknown illness. The Managing Director K. Srinivasan served as editor from 1926 to 1928, when A. Rangaswami Iyengar took over.
