= Uyirullavarai Usha =

- Theatrical release poster
- Directed by: T. Rajendar
- Written by: T. Rajendar
- Produced by: Usha Rajendar
- Starring: Saritha; T. Rajendar; Ganga; Nalini
- Cinematography: Soman
- Edited by: R. Devarajan
- Music by: T. Rajendar
- Production company: Thanjai Cini Arts
- Release date: 4 March 1983
- Running time: 141 minutes
- Country: India
- Language: Tamil

Uyirullavarai Usha (transl. Lifelong with Usha) is a 1983 Indian Tamil-language romantic action film written, directed and scored by T. Rajendar. The film stars Saritha, Rajendar, Ganga and Nalini. It is the debut for Rajendar and Nalini in leading roles. The film was released on 4 March 1983 and became a success. It was remade in Kannada as Premigala Saval (1984) and in Hindi as Aag Aur Shola (1986), and dubbed in Telugu as Prema Sagaram.

== Cast ==
- Saritha
- T. Rajendar as Chain Jayapal
- Ganga as Raja
- Nalini as Usha
- Radha Ravi
- Vennira Aadai Moorthy as Professor
- Manoharan
- Goundamani
- S. S. Chandran
- Selvaraj
- Usilai Mani
- Gandhimathi
- Savithri
- Kalaichelvi
- Chandra

== Production ==
The film was originally titled Chain Jayapal, but was later retitled Uyirullavari Usha, paying homage to T. Rajendar's then wife Usha. The lead role was originally offered to Rajinikanth, who decided not to do the role, resulting in Rajendar debuting as lead actor. The film also marked the acting debut of Nalini as lead actress. Rajendar decided to cast Ganga in another leading role, at a time when other producers were reluctant to cast him in their films. The songs "Indiralogathu Sundari" and "Mogam Vandhu" were shot at Karpagam Studios.

== Soundtrack ==
The music was composed by T. Rajendar who also wrote the lyrics. The song "Vaigai Karai Katre" was written by Rajendar to convey his grief when briefly separated from Usha, who went abroad for a dance event. The title references the Vaigai River, and Usha's Madurai roots. For the dubbed Telugu version Prema Sagaram, all lyrics were written by Rajasri. The song "Indiralogathu Sundari" was later sampled by Flying Lotus for "GNG BNG" from the album Los Angeles (2008).

Tamil

Song	Singers	Length
"Adi Ennadi"	Malaysia Vasudevan	04:35
"Unnaithane"	Kalayanam, S. Janaki	05:56
"Mogam Vanthu"	S. P. Balasubrahmanyam, S. Janaki	04:43
"Indiralogathu Sundari"	S. P. Balasubrahmanyam, B.S. Sasireka	04:43
"Kat Adippom"	S. P. Balasubrahmanyam	04:22
"Vaigai Karai Katre"	K. J. Yesudas	04:44
"Ithayamathai Kovil Enren"	T. M. Soundararajan	04:10

Telugu version

Song	Singers	Length
"Banthade Bangaaru"	S. P. Balasubrahmanyam	04:38
"Chakkanaina O Chirugali"	S. P. Balasubrahmanyam	04:31
"Naamam Pettu Naamam"	S. P. Balasubrahmanyam	03:53
"Nee Thalape Maikam"	S. P. Balasubrahmanyam	05:47
"Neelo Naalo"	S. P. Balasubrahmanyam, S. Janaki	04:46
"Andhalolike Sundari"	S. P. Balasubrahmanyam, S. P. Sailaja	04:27
"Hrudayamane Kovelalo"	Madhavapeddi Ramesh	04:40

== Release and reception ==
Uyirullavarai Usha was released on 4 March 1983. Rajendar struggled to find a distributor for the film, with the trade blaming him of "going back to the M.G.R. era". Despite these criticisms, the film became successful at the box office. Ananda Vikatan said the film's plus points were its songs and score. Thiraignani of Kalki criticised the film for having a Oru Thalai Ragam (1980) hangover.

== Re-release ==
The film was re-released on 13 February 2026, having been delayed from September 2025.
