= ANUSAT =

Indian student research microsatellite

- Mission type: Amateur radio Technology
- Operator: Anna University (Madras Institute of Technology and College of Engineering, Guindy) Campuses, Chennai Tamil Nadu
- COSPAR ID: 2009-019B
- SATCAT no.: 34808
- Mission duration: 2 years
- Orbits completed: 15287

Spacecraft properties
- Launch mass: 40 kilograms (88 lb)
- Power: watts

Start of mission
- Launch date: 20 April 2009, 01:15 UTC
- Rocket: PSLV-CA C12
- Launch site: Satish Dhawan SLP
- Contractor: ISRO

End of mission
- Last contact: 9 January 2012
- Decay date: 18 April 2012

Orbital parameters
- Reference system: Geocentric
- Regime: Low Earth
- Perigee altitude: 402 kilometres (250 mi)
- Apogee altitude: 552 kilometres (343 mi)
- Inclination: 41.2 degrees
- Period: 94.14 minutes
- Epoch: 22 April 2009

ANUSAT (Anna University Satellite) was an Indian student research microsatellite designed, developed and integrated by students and faculty members at Anna University's Madras Institute of Technology and College of Engineering, Guindy. The satellite carried an amateur radio store-and-forward communication system and technology-demonstration experiments. It was launched on 20 April 2009 aboard a PSLV-C12 rocket alongside RISAT-2 from the Satish Dhawan Space Centre. ANUSAT completed 15,287 orbits by January 2012, exceeding its intended two-year mission life.

== History ==
The Anna University Satellite, or ANUSAT was an Indian student research microsatellite designed, developed and integrated at Aerospace Engineering, Madras Institute of Technology (MIT), Chromepet, Anna University. Students and faculty members of Madras Institute of Technology and College of Engineering, Guindy were involved in the design of ANUSAT. The project director of the ANUSAT was Dr. P. Dhanraj, CASR, Madras Institute of Technology, Chromepet.

ANUSAT was a cube with 23-inch (580 mm) long sides, and a mass of 38 kilograms (84 lb). It carried an amateur radio store and forward communications system, and also conducted technological research. This satellite was spin stabilized and spin axis is pointed normal towards the Sun. The satellite was integrated and tested at MICSAT, the MIT Chromepet clean room. As on January 9, 2012, ANUSAT completed 15287 orbits around the Earth thereby exceeding its intended mission life of two years.

ISRO approved the project in January 2002 as the first microsatellite programme carried out in a university environment, and it funded the satellite and provided the launch. Most subsystems used commercial off-the-shelf components, and an independent ground station was set up at the Madras Institute of Technology campus. The store-and-forward payload used a 145.8 MHz VHF uplink and a 435 MHz UHF downlink in a digital mode, and secondary payloads included a MEMS gyroscope, a MEMS magnetometer and a satellite positioning system.

Body-mounted gallium arsenide solar cells produced about 40 W, with a 10 Ah lithium-ion battery as backup. The satellite sent housekeeping telemetry on 137.4 MHz and received commands on 149.2 MHz, and its attitude control used a magnetometer, twin-slit sun sensors and torquers on three axes to hold its spin rate at 8 rpm. It was only partially successful in its store-and-forward operations but relayed health data such as solar and battery power status, temperature, magnetic field readings, sun angle and spin rate. The mission ended in April 2012 after more than 1,000 days in orbit.

It carries an amateur radio and technology demonstration experiments. It was successfully Integrated at the clean room facility at MIT, Chrompet, Chennai and launched aboard a PSLV-CA designated PSLV-C12, along with RISAT-2, from the Second Launch Pad at the Satish Dhawan Space Centre. The launch was carried out at 01:15 GMT (06:45 IST) on 20 April 2009. The satellite's development was sponsored by the Indian Space Research Organisation, who were also responsible for launch services.
