= C. S. Narasimhan =

Indian journalist

- Born: C. Srinivasan Narasimhan; 25 July 1925
- Died: 17 March 2004 (aged 78)
- Occupation: journalist

C. Srinivasan Narasimhan (25 July 1925 – 17 March 2004) was an Indian journalist who served as the managing director of the Tamil newspaper Swadesamitran from 1962 to 1985. He was the paper's last managing director and presided over its liquidation in 1985.

== Early life ==
Narasimhan was born on 25 July 1925 to journalist C. R. Srinivasan of the famous Kasturi family. He had his education in Madras and started working for the Swadesamitran at an early age. Narasimhan was a classmate of M. Narasimham, Governor of the Reserve Bank of India (1977–79).

== Career ==
Narasimhan became the managing director of the Swadesamitran on the death of his father, Srinivasan in 1962. Swadesaamitran's decline began soon afterwards. Plagued with labour problems and stiff competition from Ramnath Goenka's Dinamani, Narasimhan felt compelled to sell off the newspaper. Failing to find buyers, the paper was liquidated in 1985.

== Later life ==
Narasimhan died on 17 March 2004 at the age of 78.
