= Kasturi Venugopal =

Indian journalist

Kasturi Venugopal is an Indian journalist who serves as editor of The Hindu Business Line. Venugopal is the younger son of Gopalan Kasturi.
