= Aag Aur Shola =

1986 film by Kovelamudi Bapayya

- Theatrical release poster
- Directed by: K. Bapaiah
- Screenplay by: K. Bapaiah
- Story by: T. Rajender
- Based on: Uyirullavarai Usha (1983) by T. Rajender
- Produced by: Prasan Kapoor; Jeetendra (presents)
- Starring: Jeetendra; Sridevi; Ashish Chanana; Mandakini
- Cinematography: A. Venkat
- Edited by: Waman Bhosle; Gurudutt Shirali
- Music by: Laxmikant–Pyarelal
- Production company: Tirupati Pictures Enterprises
- Release date: 21 February 1986
- Running time: 148 minutes
- Country: India
- Language: Hindi

Aag Aur Shola (transl. Fire & Flames) is a 1986 Indian Hindi-language action romance film, produced by Prasan Kapoor under the Tirupati Pictures Enterprises banner, written by Kader Khan and directed by K. Bapaiah. It stars Jeetendra, Sridevi, Mandakini, and Ashish Chanana, with music composed by Laxmikant–Pyarelal. The film was a remake of the Tamil film Uyirullavarai Usha.

== Plot ==
Aag Aur Shola is the story of love, eternal and immortal. It is also the story of hatred, the kind of hatred, the existence of which shall remain till the existence of this world. Poor Raju (Ashish Channa) loved Usha (Mandakini), but she proudly refused to reciprocate. Nagesh (Shakti Kapoor), brother of Usha was a rogue. When he learned that Raju loved Usha, he attacked Raju and beat him like a beast. In spite of all this, the fire of love for Usha was still burning in his heart.

On the other side, Nagesh was furious and wanted to kill Raju if he was still adamant. Raju had no other alternative than to go to Vishal for help. Golden-hearted Vishal (Jeetendra) was not only generous but in strength, he was like a rock. Vishal's past resembled Raju's present. He had played with fire and had lost his beloved Aarti (Sridevi). Raju also was playing with fire and would meet with the same fate, but Vishal was now determined to help Raju. Nagesh would marry Usha with the boy of his choice, but on the other side, Vishal had promised Raju to get him married with Usha only. This was a great challenge for both Nagesh and Vishal. It was with all his sympathies to Raju on one side and the tyrant Nagesh on the other side and there in between them were the innocent lovers.

== Cast ==
- Jeetendra as Vishal
- Sridevi as Aarti
- Ashish Channa as Raju
- Mandakini as Usha
- Shakti Kapoor as Nagesh
- Kadar Khan as College Lecturer Chogamal Hoshiyarpuri
- Asrani as Micheal
- Jagdeep as Laddan
- Viju Khote as Police Constable Gayaram
- Suresh Oberoi as Vijay, Aarti's mamaji
- Shoma Anand as Sapna, Usha's elder sister
- Bindu as Anuradha, Aarti's mamiji
- Aruna Irani as Sarita, Raju's bua
- Manik Irani as Jumbo
- Guddi Maruti as Collegian Vanita
- Yunus Parvez as Hasmukhlal, Aarti's groom
- Satish Shah as Vidyasagar
- Dalip Tahil as Inspector Ram

== Soundtrack ==
The music composed by Laxmikant-Pyarelal and songs written by Anand Bakshi.

Song	Singer
"Nakhrewali Jhatkewali"	Mohammed Aziz
"Aaj Subah Jab Main Jaga"	Lata Mangeshkar, Mohammed Aziz
"Meethi Meethi Hoti Hai Kasak, Haay Re"	Asha Bhosle, Manhar Udhas
"Barsa Re Barsa, Ab Ke Baras Yun"	Manhar Udhas, Anuradha Paudwal
"Ek Ladki Jiska Naam Mohabbat"	Mohammed Aziz, Kavita Krishnamurthy
