= Swadesamitran =

Defunct Tamil language newspaper

- Type: Daily newspaper
- Format: Broadsheet
- Owner: The Swadesamitran Limited
- Publisher: The Swadesamitran Limited
- Founded: 1882
- Language: Tamil
- Headquarters: Madras, India

Swadesamitran was a Tamil language newspaper that was published from the then Madras city from 1882 to 1985. One of the earliest Tamil newspapers and the longest in print, Swadesamitran was founded by Indian nationalist G. Subramania Iyer four years after he had started The Hindu. The newspaper was sold to A. Rangaswami Iyengar of the Kasturi family in 1915 and the newspaper remained with them until its liquidation in 1985.

== History ==
Swadesamitran (1881–1985) was the first Tamil language newspaper owned and operated by Indians. It was published from Chennai (then called Madras). It was founded by G Subramania Aiyer who also served as the papers first editor. It was founded as a sister paper of The Hindu which Aiyer had also founded two years earlier in 1879. The name translated from Tamil to English literally means "friend of self rule".

It was originally started as a weekly and became a daily by 1889. It was a chronicle of the Indian National Independence movement from its inception and it was used by Subramania Aiyer to rouse the nationalistic feelings of the Tamil people. A host of men like Subramania Pillai, Mahakavi Subramania Bharathi (aka "Bharathiyar"), VVS Iyer and other worked as editor or sub-editors of the paper during the struggle for Independence. These men used familiar anecdotes from the great epics of the Ramayana and Mahabharata to rouse public opinion in the cause of nationalism within Tamil Nadu (then known as The Madras Presidency). Bharthiyar was sub-editor from 1904 to 1906 when he left to start his own publication "India".

The Swadesamitran was the second vernacular newspaper published in India. The first was Kesari which was published in Hindi. Subramania Aiyer although more comfortable in English, was determined to take the discussion of the future of India's independence to the masses. He was supported by Deshbandhu Chittranjan Das (CR Das) and Motilal Nehru in this approach. The paper was successful quite early in its life and quickly found readership wherever there was a significant Tamil population not only in India but also in Burma, Sri Lanka and Mauritius.

Subramania Aiyer was also a social reformer and sponsored the Madras Hindu Social Reform Association. During his tenure as editor he was also prosecuted and sentenced for sedition (1908) by the British due to his writings in the paper. He was never the same man after he went to prison. After his death (?) the paper was run by Rangaswamy Iyengar (Kasthuri Ranga Iyengars nephew and right-hand man at the Hindu) and thereafter by CR Srinivasan (died 1962). Rangaswamy and Srinivasan were a potent combination and when Bharathiyar rejoined the newspaper in 1920 the three of them took the paper to lofty new heights of popularity and fame.

It was under Srinivasan's leadership that it became a Public Limited Company "The Swadesamitran Limited" which became the publisher of the newspaper. After Srinivasan's death his son CS Narasimhan sold the controlling shares held by him to the Silver Jubilee of Independence Trust of the Congress Party headed by former Tamil Nadu Chief Minisher Shri M Bhaktavatsalam.

This Trust continued to run the paper till August 1977 when due to financial and other reasons the publication of the paper was stopped and the company was on the verge of bankruptcy. It was purchased from the Trust by John Thomas (born 1 August 1924, died 18 November 2001) a distinguished lawyer of the Madras High Court and successful local businessman. The paper was shut down for 30 months but the new proprietor was determined that such a storied icon of India's independence movement should not go quietly into the night. He was able to resurrect the newspaper and it began publication again in March 1980 under editor Sundaresan. The newspaper went back to its origins and its editorial pages were openly supportive of the Congress Party and Prime Minister Indira Gandhi in particular.

Swadesamitran published a Who's Who in Tamil Nadu in 1980-1981 (edited by Philip Thomas born 18 July 1960 died 9 May 2006) and the publication was released in Madurai by Prime Minister Smt. Indira Gandhi during the celebrations marking the 2000th anniversary of the birth of Thiruvalluvar, the great Tamil poet and author of Thirukural.

The Swadesamitran was printed at the company's Printing Press and office "Deshbandu Bhavan" on Whites Road in Royapettah, Madras. The company also owned Victory House on Anna Salai (formerly Mount Road). The property was formerly the Whiteaways Building and was purchased by CR Srinivasan. He renamed it Victory House to reflect the success of the Quit India movement.

== Managing Directors ==
- G. Subramania Iyer (1882–1915)
- A. Rangaswami Iyengar (1915–1934)
- C. R. Srinivasan (1934–1955)
- C. S. Narasimhan (1955–1977)
- J. Thomas (1977–1985)
- R.Asokan (1985–present)

== Editors ==
- G. Subramania Iyer (1882–1915)
- A. Rangaswami Iyengar (1915–1928)
- M. P. Srinivasan (1924-1964)
- C. R. Srinivasan (1928–1962)
- C. S. Narasimhan (1962–1985)
