= A. Rangaswami Iyengar =

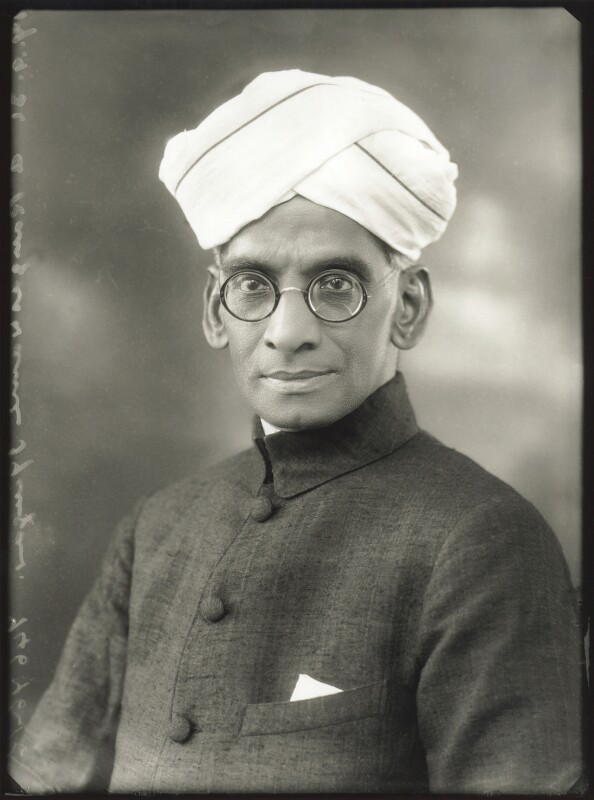
- Rangaswami Iyengar in 1931
- Born: July 1877; Erukathur, Madras Presidency
- Died: 4 February 1934 (Age 56); Madras, British India
- Occupations: lawyer, journalist, politician
- Employer: The Hindu
- Known for: journalism, British constitutional expertise

A. Rangaswami Iyengar (July 1877 – 4 February 1934) was an Indian journalist, lawyer and politician who served as a member of the Central Legislative Assembly and as the chief editor of The Hindu from 1928 till his death in 1934. He was a nephew of Kasturi Ranga Iyengar.

== Early life ==
Rangaswami Iyengar was born in the village of Erukathur near Tiruvarur in the then Tanjore district in July 1877 to Narasimha Iyengar. He studied law in Madras. On completion of his studies, he practised as a lawyer in the Madras High Court.

== Career ==
When Kasturi Ranga Iyengar purchased The Hindu in 1905, he appointed Rangaswami Iyengar as an assistant editor. Rangaswami Iyengar served as assistant editor from 1905 to 1915, when he resigned to manage the affairs of its sister publication Swadesamitran. Rangaswami Iyengar joined the Swaraj Party and served as its General Secretary from 1925 to 1927.

Rangaswami was elected to the Central Legislative Assembly for two consecutive terms in 1923 and 1926. On S. Rangaswami Iyengar's death in 1926, Rangaswami Iyengar returned to The Hindu and served as its chief editor from 1928 to 1934. During his tenure as chief editor, Rangaswami Iyengar was one of the representatives at the Second Round Table Conference held in London in 1931.

== Death ==
Rangaswami Iyengar died in 1934. He was succeeded as chief editor of The Hindu by K. Srinivasan.

== Works ==
- Iyengar, A. Rangaswami (1933). The Newspaper Press in India. Bangalore Press.
- Iyengar, A. Rangaswami. The Indian Constitution, An Introductory Study.
