= C. Karunakara Menon =

Indian journalist and politician

Diwan Bahadur Cozhissery Karunakara Menon
- Born: 1863; Parappanangadi, Malabar district, Madras Presidency
- Died: 1922 (aged 58–59); Parappanangadi, Kerala
- Education: Madras University
- Occupations: Journalist, Politician
- Political party: Independent
- Spouse: C. Parukutty Amma

Diwan Bahadur Cozhisseri Karunakara Menon (1863–1922) was an Indian journalist and politician from the erstwhile Madras Presidency. He was the second editor of The Hindu after G. Subramania Iyer and the founder of the Indian Patriot.

Karunakara Menon was born at Parappanangadi, Malabar district (Cozhisseri Tharavadu, Neduva) and had his higher education in Madras. He served as a sub-editor of The Hindu till 1898 and as editor from 1898 to 1905. In 1905, he started the Indian Patriot which was closed in 1924. He was a prominent public man and took part in the political events of his time.

Menon died in 1922 in his residence 'Cozhisseri' at Parappanangadi, Kerala State due to complications following a stroke. He was highly regarded by V. Krishnaswamy Iyer, Veeraraghavachariar, G. Subramania Iyer and Governor of Madras, Sir Arthur Lawley.

== Early life ==
Karunakara Menon was born in a Nair family (Cozhisseri Tharavadu) of Parappanangadi, Malabar district, Madras Presidency. He graduated in law from the University of Madras and joined The Hindu as a sub-editor.

On graduation, he plunged into public life in 1890 when he opposed the Malabar Marriage Bill of T. Muthuswamy Iyer. Menon's opposition to the bill impressed Muthuswamy Iyer to such an extent that a close friendship developed between the two. During this time, Menon also developed friendship with T. Madhava Rao.

== Rise to prominence ==
When G. Subramania Iyer, the editor of The Hindu, travelled to the United Kingdom to give evidence before the Welby Commission, Menon managed the newspaper in his absence with the assistance of Mr. Natarajan, who later became the editor of the Indian Social Reform.

When Veeraraghavachariar took over The Hindu in October 1898, he appointed Karunakara Menon as the editor. Menon edited The Hindu till 1905 when he founded The Indian Patriot.

In 1903, Veeraraghavachariar said of Karunakara Menon:

I have every reason to be proud that he has maintained the prestige of the paper unimpaired, coming as he did after Mr. G. Subramania Aiyer

== Editorship of The Indian Patriot ==
The Indian Patriot toed a difficult path. It was one of the few newspapers of the time which openly supported the Indian National Congress. It strongly opposed the perpetuators of the Alipore bomb case and claimed to stand on the side of law and order.

The British responded by honouring Karunakara Menon with a "Diwan Bahadur" for his assistance.

Menon antagonised both the extremists as well as the British establishment and devoid of support, he was forced to sell his newspaper to meet expenses.

== Death ==
Menon died in 1922 at his residence Cozhissery House in Parappanangadi due to complications of stroke.

== As a statesman ==
V. Krishnaswamy Iyer had a very high opinion of Menon's abilities. He felt that Menon was a statesman of good calibre and that he was wasting his time in the journalism profession. He is believed to have remarked once:

You are a statesman. You cannot run a newspaper without sensationalism nowadays. You must go elsewhere.

Krishnaswamy Iyer's views were supported by the fact that the then Governor of Madras, Arthur Lawley consulted Menon regularly. It is believed that Menon had enough statesmanship ability to serve as a Diwan of Travancore or Chief Minister of Madras.

== Ideology ==
Menon supported the Home Rule Movement in Madras Presidency. Even while he opposed the political ambitions of the non-Brahmin movement he still supported their social reform activities.

== Works ==
- Menon, C. Karunakara (1890). Observations on the Malabar Marriage Bill. National Press.
