= Madras Institute of Technology =

Engineering institute in Chennai, India

Madras Institute of Technology (MIT)
- Motto: In the service of India
- Type: Public, Autonomous
- Established: 18 July 1949 (76 years ago)
- Founders: Chinnaswami Rajam
- Affiliations: Anna University
- Dean: P. Jayashree
- Undergraduates: 2000 (approx)
- Postgraduates: 300 (approx)
- Location: Chennai, Tamil Nadu, India; 12.9481°N 80.13974°E
- Campus: Urban (60 acre)
- Colors: White Purple
- Nickname: MITians
- Website: http://www.mitindia.edu/

Madras Institute of Technology (MIT) is an engineering institute located in Chromepet, Chennai, India. It is one of the four autonomous constituent colleges of Anna University. It was established in 1949 by Chinnaswami Rajam as the first self-financing engineering institute in the country and later merged with Anna University. The institute was among the first educational institutions in India to offer new areas of specialization, such as aeronautical engineering, automobile engineering, electronics engineering and instrumentation technology. Madras Institute of Technology (MIT) was the first self-financing institute opened in India.

Madras Institute of Technology (MIT) is also among the institutes in India that offer postgraduate courses in Avionics and Mechatronics. The institute has a unique practice of "T numbers" that facilitates mentoring of students by their respective seniors.

Established in 1949, Madras Institute of Technology (MIT) initially offered three-year diploma courses (DMIT) in Engineering for Science graduates (B.Sc.). After Anna University was established in 1978, Madras Institute of Technology (MIT) became one of the constituent institutions of the university. After this merging, three-year B.Tech. Degree courses were offered to B.Sc. graduates. Over the years, the institute has expanded its original programmes. Presently, it provides undergraduate and postgraduate courses in Production Engineering, Rubber and Plastics Technology, Computer Science Engineering and Information Technology. Since 1996, the institute has accepted students who have passed the 12th board examinations for its four-year undergraduate programme.

== History ==
After India's independence, the need for establishing engineering institutions to propel the industrial development in the country was felt by Chinnaswami Rajam. To establish an institution, Rajam sought the support of distinguished citizens including Subbaraya Aiyar, M.K. Ranganathan, L.Venkatakrishna Iyer, K.Srinivasan and C.R. Srinivasan. He also received generous donations from the industries as well as the public. In July 1949, he founded Madras Institute of Technology (MIT) under the University of Madras.

== Administration ==
Madras Institute of Technology (MIT) is a constituent college of Anna University and is governed by the Chancellor, Vice Chancellor and Registrar of the Anna university. The varsity has a syndicate. The Dean is the head of the institute and oversees day-to-day administration. Each department is led by a Head of the Department (HOD). The hostels are headed by assistant executive wardens placed under an executive warden with Dean as the ex-officio warden.

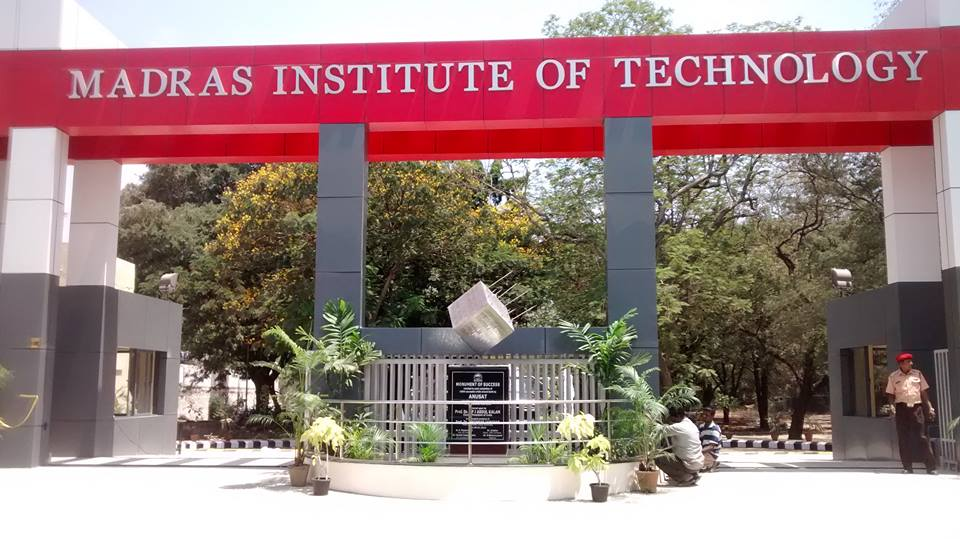
MIT's newly built entrance

The academic policies are decided by the course committee that is headed by a chairman. All the professors and student representatives are its members.

Madras Institute of Technology follows the choice based credit system(CBCS) of performance evaluation and student-teacher relation, with proportional weighting of courses based on their importance. The total marks (usually out of 100) form the basis of grades, with a grade value (out of 10) assigned to a range of marks. Each semester, the students are graded by taking a weighted average of all the courses with their respective credit points. Each semester's evaluation is done independently with a cumulative grade point average (CGPA) reflecting the average performance across semesters.

Currently, the admission to the institute is through the Tamil Nadu Engineering Admissions process based on a Unified Single Window Admission System for the first year of undergraduate courses. Till 2006, TNPCEE was also a mandatory qualification examination along with the Higher Secondary examination.

- Department of Aerospace Engineering – The Department of Aerospace Engineering was established in 1949 for furthering Aerospace Research in the newborn nation. It was the first department to offer an undergraduate (UG) course in Aeronautical Engineering in India. The department runs one full-time UG, three full-time postgraduate (PG), one part-time UG and one part-time PG courses. The department also offers M.S. (By research) and Ph.D. research programs in various areas related to Aerospace Engineering.

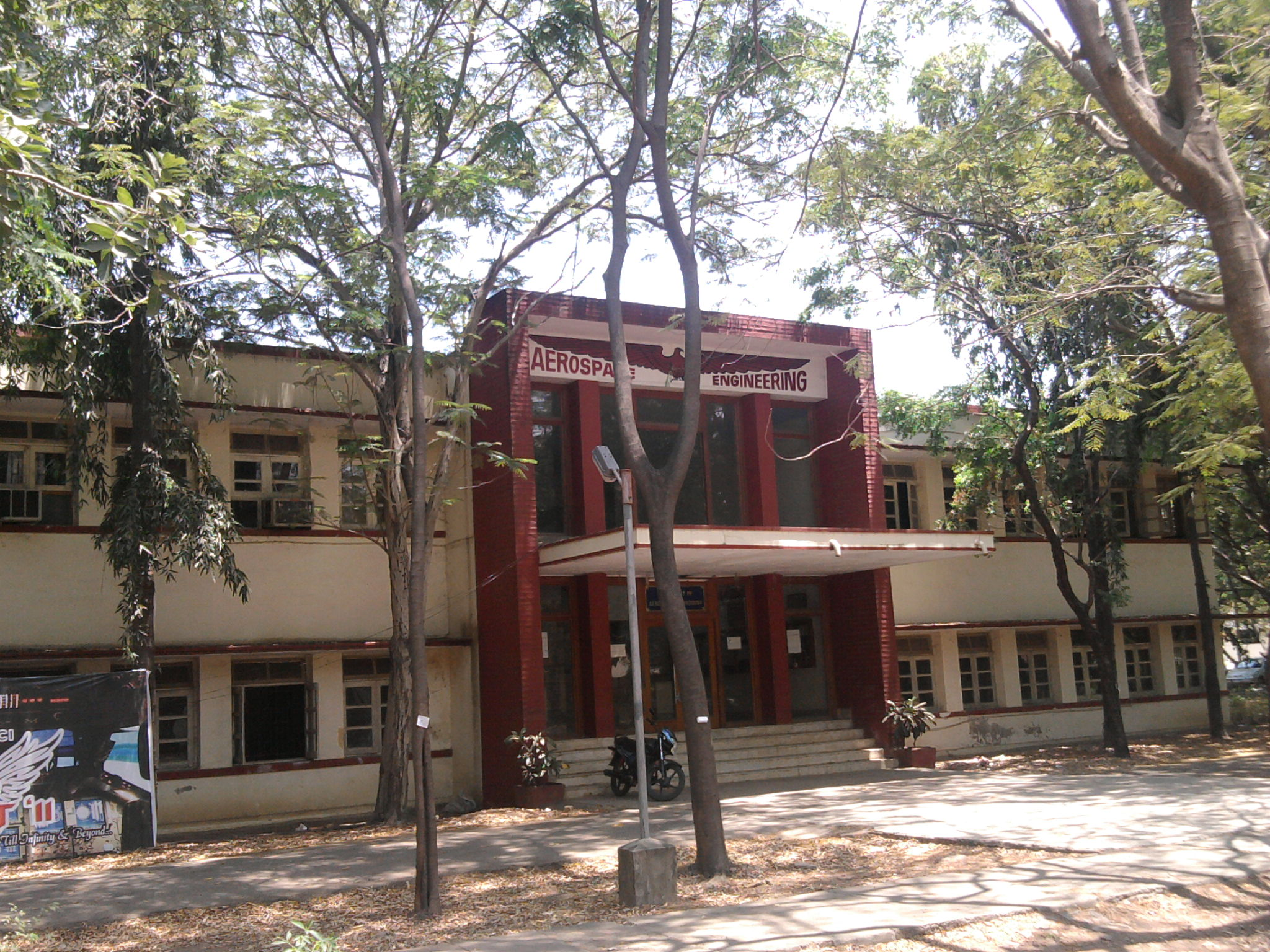
Department of Aerospace Engineering, MIT

- Department of Automobile Engineering – This is also one of oldest departments offered by the college since its inception. The college offers both undergraduate and postgraduate courses. The annual student intake is 60. The Head of the Department is S Jayaraj and the president of AEA (Automobile Engineering Association). The Department of Automobile Engineering at MIT was started in 1949 and was offering a three-year (undergraduate course) in Automobile Engineering for Science graduates (BSc). Subsequently, on the formation of Anna University in 1978, MIT became one of the constituent institutions of the university and hence, the department has also become a department of Anna University. The postgraduate programme was started in 1978. This is the only pioneering Institute which is offering both undergraduate and postgraduate programmes in Automobile Engineering in the whole of India, besides offering MS (by research) and PhD Programmes. From 1996 onwards a four-year BTech undergraduate programme for students of higher secondary education is being offered. The department is involved in the programmes of the Centre for Automotive Research and Training (CART).
- Department of Electronics & Communication Engineering – The Department of Electronics Engineering was established in 1949. It has its core strength in the area of Electronics & Communication. This is the largest department of the MIT campus of Anna University, which has about 25 faculty members serving about 400 undergraduate students and 100 postgraduate students. The research areas include Communication Technologies, Wireless Communication, Network Security, Sensor Networks, Optical Communication, Avionics, Signal Processing, Image Processing & Pattern Recognition and VLSI. The department has collaborative partners from academia and industry both locally and worldwide.
- Department of Instrumentation Engineering – The Department of Instrumentation Engineering was established in the year 1949 at MIT campus in Anna University. Originally the Degree was offered as BTech, Instrument Technology after 1978. Later it was changed as BTech, Instrument Engineering, three-year Degree course for BSc Science graduates. Presently the Instrumentation Engineering Department offers Electronics and Instrumentation Engineering at UG level, 4-year degree course for 12th class passed students from 1996 onwards, Instrumentation Engineering at PG level, and PhD / MS (by research) for both regular and Part-time scholars. The core strength of the Instrumentation Engineering Department MIT Campus, Anna University is Process Control & Instrumentation. Currently Srinivasan is the Head of the department.
- Department of Information Technology- The Department of Information Technology was established in 2000. The branch of "Information Technology" has an intake strength of 120 every year (recently 2007-08 increased). The department includes an undergraduate and postgraduate programme running in parallel. It has both a full-time and part-time programme for the undergraduate programme. The department receives funds from DST under FIST programme. The research areas include Grid computing, XML technologies, Networking and connectivity protocols, cloud computing, network security and Databases. Currently Dhananjay Kumar is the head of the department.
- Department of Computer Technology- The Department of Computer Technology was established in 2010. The branch of "Computer Technology" has an intake strength of 120 every year (undergraduate). The department includes an undergraduate and postgraduate programme running in parallel. The research areas include Cloud Computing, Grid Computing, XML technologies, Networking and connectivity protocols, network security and Databases, E-learning, Multimedia, and Video Streaming. Currently R Gunasekaran is the head of the department.
- Department of Production Technology – The Department of Production Technology started with a three-year BTech Production Engineering programme (for BSc graduates) in 1977 with an intake of 20 students and an ME programme in 1993. The department offers B.E. in Production Engineering and B.E. Mechanical Engineering (started in 2015) and ME in Manufacturing Engineering, and Mechatronics Engineering. It offers part-time undergraduate programmes in the areas of Mechanical Engineering, Production Engineering and a postgraduate programme in Manufacturing Engineering. For the first time in India, a postgraduate programme in ME Mechatronics was started in 1999 with an intake of 15 students.
- Department of Rubber & Plastics Technology – The Department of Rubber & Plastics is one of the pioneering departments of MIT, keeping to the tradition of MIT in being a non-conventional course offered under the Engineering curriculum. The department was started in 1988 and offers a BTech. Degree programme in Rubber & Plastics Technology and an MTech programme in Rubber Technology. The inter-disciplinary BTech programme boasts of successful alumni across the country in diverse Engineering fields ranging from Rubber and Plastics, Automobile Components, Mechanics as well as IT and Consulting industries besides a good number of them having proved as thriving Entrepreneurs. The department has the highest percentage of PhDs and industry experienced faculty among all the other departments of Madras Institute of Technology (MIT).

== Research centres ==
- Centre for Aerospace Research: The Centre for Aerospace Research (CASR) came into being in 2000 and focuses on advancing research in aerospace sciences. The Centre has a design, analysis and computational capabilities to take up problems in high speed and low speed flows, structure, aero-thermal effect and composites. The applications software being regularly employed include MSC-NASTRAN, STAR-CD, CFX, I_DEAS and tascflow. For carrying out experimental studies in the thrust areas, the Centre has laboratories and facilities with specialized equipment. The country's first student-developed satellite ANUSAT is designed, developed and integrated at this facility. The aerospace department includes the avionics department which designs the control software.
- Anna University – K B Chandrasekhar Research Centre (AU-KBCRC): The Anna University K B Chandrashekar Research Centre was established at the MIT Campus in May 1999 through the donation of ₹ 1.00 crore by K B Chandrasekhar, chairman and co-founder of Exodus Communications. The infrastructure includes a 256 kbit/s Internet access over a 2 Mbit/s based line, high-end server with broad-based networking. The research activities of the Centre are on cryptography, network security, internet access over the power line medium and many others. In addition, the KBC Foundation has donated another ₹ 0.5 crore rupees towards setting up a state-of–art Java lab at the Centre and ₹ 1.5 crore rupees for the campus networking and video conferencing facilities. One of the goals of the centre is to link value-addition to the domain-knowledge possessed by the faculty and the students of our university in diverse domains through the use of the Internet and computer software.
- Centre for Automotive Research and Training: The Centre for Automotive Research and Training (CART), an inter-disciplinary Centre, was established in the year 1997 by the university to mainly cater to the needs of the automotive industry with regard to design, research, consultancy, training and testing. The Centre functions currently both at the main campus and at the MIT campus. The Centre proposes to offer a postgraduate programme titled, automotive manufacturing management, which will be a highly inter-disciplinary programme mainly framed with inputs from the user industry, namely the automotive industry. The centre acts as a nodal agency interacting with automotive industries both at home and abroad and with various academic departments and centers', functioning at Anna University.

== Student organisations ==
The institute has active National Service Scheme, National Sports Organisation (India) and Youth Red Cross chapters on its campus. Each chapter is headed by a faculty member. Membership and active participation in one of these organizations are mandatory for first-year undergraduate students. There are also various events conducted in a regular interval of time to ensure student participation and coordination. The Box Office a.k.a. TBO is the brain child of a group of pre-final year students who took the help of one of the most instrumental Professors, A.R.S. Jayanth, and established the institute's first official dramatics club.

Year Estd.	Student organisation	Intra-college	Inter-college
2013	The Box Office (TBO)	D for Debate	National Unity Week Debate
1983	Computer Society	Enigma	Carte Blanche
1984	Personality Development Association	Persofest	Spontania
2010	MIT Quill	Inksanity	Renaissance
	Youth Red Cross	-	
2017	TEDc MIT	-	Innovate
	MITRA( MIT Robotics Association)		Dexbot
	QCMIT( Quiz Club of MIT)		Blitzkrieg
	Rotaract Club	Rotofest	Sparish

== Magazines ==
- MIT has an annual magazine MITMAG.
- The students of the college started a newsletter and a writers' club named "The MIT Quill" . Its website hosts a number of articles written by its contributors and publishes a yearly magazine named The Quill Digest.
- The Personality Development Association publishes its magazine PERSOPLUS.
- Youth Red Cross publishes its magazine Vircham related to Social Awareness.
- The Computer Society publishes its magazine TECH TIMES.
- The Department of Electronics Engineering releases its annual magazine Impetus.
- The Department of Instrumentation publishes its technical magazine Ins True.
- The Department of Production Technology releases its yearly magazine PRO-MAG.
- The Rotaract Club of MIT publishes its annual magazine RotoPlus which is a collection of art and writings from physically challenged and orphanage children.

== Events ==
Apart from this Homefest, the cultural and sports festival of Madras Institute of Technology Hostels is held during the month of April every year. Homefest is organised by the student body of the Madras Institute of Technology hostels, The Hostel Committee. Final year hostel students take part in organizing this festival from scratch every year. It was organized by using the official fund and money from students.

== Techfest and symposia ==
Apart from this, MIT presented "Asymptote 2009" along with its diamond jubilee celebrations. Asymptote-2009 was held on 9, 10 and 11 January 2009. Students from other colleges participated in the event. But this was not continued in the following years.

Every department has an intra-college and inter-college technical symposium.

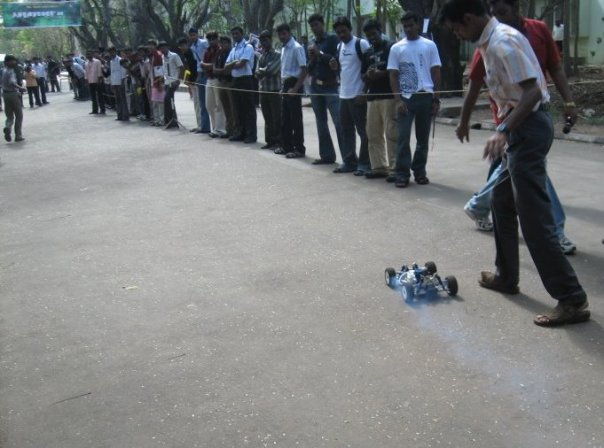
Participants overlook an event during Asymptote 2009

== MIT Alumni Association ==
The MIT Alumni Association (MITAA) was established in Chennai, in 1966. The first general body meeting was held on 14 April 1966 and was headed by V. Gopalan (I Batch, President), C.J.G. Chandra (I Batch, VP), P.S. Subramanian (6th Batch, Secretary) and B. Venkatraman (4th Batch, Treasurer). K. Srinivasan was the dean of the institute at that time.

MITAA chapters in India and abroad (for instance, Bengaluru, Singapore and Dubai) collaborate with the parent organization as well as the institute on a regular basis.

== Notable alumni ==
- A. P. J. Abdul Kalam, 11th president of India (2002–2007), Principal Scientific Advisor to the Govt. of India (1999-2002), Director General of Defence Research and Development Organisation (1992-1999) & recipient of the Bharat Ratna (1997)
- K. Sivan, Chairman of the Indian Space Research Organization & Secretary, Department of Space (2018–present); former Director (2015-2018) of the Vikram Sarabhai Space Centre
- Sujatha, Tamil author, novelist & screenwriter; BEL Engineer (Design and Production - Electronic Voting Machine)
- Bagavathi Perumal aka Bucks, Actor, Tamil Flim Industry
- R. Aravamudan, founding engineer (1962), INCOSPAR (now ISRO); former associate director of Vikram Sarabhai Space Centre (1980s), former director of TERLS (1970s), Satish Dhawan Space Centre (1989) & U R Rao Satellite Centre (1994)
- R. N. Agarwal, former program director, AGNI and former director, ASL; recipient of the Padma Shri (1990) & Padma Bhushan (2000)
- M. K. A. Hameed, former Member of Kerala Legislative Assembly (1967–1970); first Vice Chairman, Kerala State Planning Board (1967) & Chairman, Public Accounts Committee; first Principal, T. K. M. Engineering College, Kollam and Founder of Hycount Plastics & Chemicals
- Susi Ganeshan, Director, Tamil film industry
- Madonne Ashwin, Director, Tamil film industry

== T Numbers ==
The practice of 'T numbers' in MIT facilitates a unique mentorship system. The word is said to have originated from the term Technocrat. Each new 'technocrat' of the institute is assigned to a mentor from the previous batch. He/she also inherits the complete set of 'T-seniors' from this mentor. Mentorship activities span a whole gamut of student activities starting from passing on books, counselling, monetary help (if needed), and placement preparation assistance (mock interviews, aptitude tests).

Each Technocrat will also be assigned to a 'T-number'. The 'T-number' is a combination of the student's batch number, his/her department code and his/her roll number. For example, consider a student who has joined Electronics and Instrumentation Department (Department code is 4). If he/she belongs to the batch of 2007–2011, he/she would be the 60th batch from Electronics and Instrumentation Department and hence his 'T-number' would be '604xxx', where xxx represents the person's roll number. As per the 'T-series', this technocrat's mentor would be the person with the 'T-number' '594xxx'. Thus, the T-series can be tracked back to even the first batch of students. The best part is that when alumni from earlier batches come for get-togethers years after graduating, they still make it a practice to at least know and interact with their respective 'T-juniors' from the current batches.

== MIT Museum ==
The MIT museum was inaugurated by Anna University vice-chancellor P Mannar Jawahar on 18 March 2011. In the museum, photographs of all important events related to MIT are exhibited. The museum also chronicles newspaper coverages, books written by MITians and displays a replica of a glider made by the students of the 1952 batch.

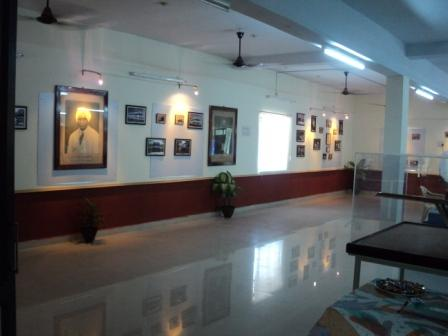
MIT Museum

== Popular media ==
The Tamil-language feature film, Five Star (2002), featured in part, the academic life at MIT. It was partly shot in MIT campus (mainly Hangar-II and hostels) during a semester break, particularly for a song in which many available students participated. The Director of the film, Susi Ganeshan is an MIT alumnus.
