= G. Subramania Iyer =

Indian journalist, social reformer and freedom fighter

Ganapathy Dikshitar Subramania Iyer
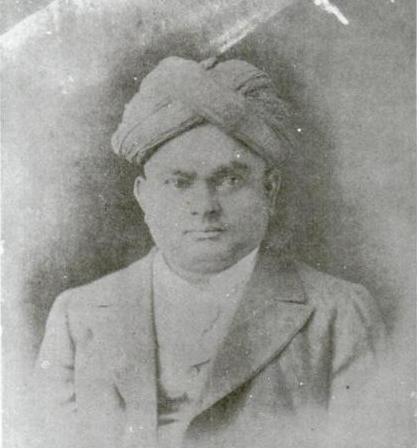
- Born: 19 January 1855 {[Thiruvaiyaru]} Tanjore, Madras Presidency, India
- Died: 18 April 1916 (aged 61); Madras Presidency, India
- Occupations: Lecturer; Journalist; Entrepreneur

Ganapathy Dikshitar Subramania Iyer (19 January 1855 – 18 April 1916) was a leading Indian journalist, social reformer and freedom fighter who led the Triplicane Six in launching The Hindu, an English newspaper on 20 September 1878. He was proprietor, editor and managing director of The Hindu from 20 September 1878 to October 1898. The Tamil language newspaper 'Swadesamitran' was also founded by him in 1891.

== Early life ==
Subramania Iyer was born in January 1855 in Tiruvadi (Thiruvaiyaru) in the then Tanjore district {[Thanjavur]}. He was the fourth of seven sons of Ganapathi Dikshitar, a pleader in the Munsiff's Court of Tiruvadi (Thiruvaiyaru). Subramania Iyer had his early schooling in Tiruvadi (Thiruvaiyaru) and matriculated from St. Peter's College, Tanjore [{Thanjavur}] in 1871. In 1873, he passed his arts examinations in merit and attended a teacher's training course at Madras from 1874 to 1875.

Subramania Iyer taught at the Church of Scotland Mission School at Madras from 1875 to 1877 and at Pachaiyappa's High School in 1877. In 1877, he cleared his B. A. examinations as a private candidate and was appointed headmaster of the Anglo-Vernacular school, Triplicane in 1879.

== Founding of The Hindu ==
To voice their support for Sir T. Muthuswamy Iyer to be appointed to the bench of the Madras High Court, Subramania Iyer founded The Hindu along with M. Veeraraghavachariar, T. T. Rangachariar, P. V. Rangachariar, D. Kesava Rao Pantulu and N. Subba Rao Pantulu, on 20 September 1878. Initially, The Hindu was started as a weekly, but later, it was converted into a tri-weekly and then a daily.

== As editor of The Hindu 1878–1898 ==
Soon, 'The Triplicane Six' broke up when the other students were called to the Bar and editor G. Subramania Iyer and Veeraraghavachariar were the only ones who remained with the newspaper.

The Hindu made its presence felt for the first time since its inception. Subramania Iyer was known for his fiery articles with plenty of sting. Subramania Iyer actively supported the cause of India's freedom and used his newspaper to protest British Imperialism. In 1897, when Bal Gangadhar Tilak was arrested by British authorities, The Hindu vehemently condemned the arrest. On 3 December 1883, the paper moved to 100 Mount Road and established its own press called 'The National Press'.

The Hindu welcomed the birth of the Indian National Congress in a 12 December 1885 editorial:

The objective of the Congress... is to bring to a focus to our scattered political energy and to give solidity and organisation to native opinion... [on such] topics in which... all parts of the country are interested...

In May 1889, at Subramania Iyer's invitation, the Anglo-Indian barrister Eardley Norton began to write a regular column Olla Podrida for the newspaper. The two later became intimate friends.

Subramania Iyer was dead against conservatism and blind superstitions and try to use his newspaper as a vehicle for reform. However, Subramania Iyer's articles landed the newspaper in many defamation suites and Subramania Iyer was reduced to dire financial straits while trying to fight them. In 1898, Subramania Iyer quit as Chief-editor and was succeeded by Veeraraghavachariar. In 1905, the newspaper was bought by prosperous barrister Kasturi Ranga Iyengar.

== Politics ==
Subramania Iyer actively participated in the Indian Independence movement. He was one of the 72 delegates present at the Bombay Conference at Tejpal Sanskrit College on 12 December 1885, which resulted in the founding of the Indian National Congress. In the second session of the Indian National Congress, Subramania Iyer was selected member of the committee to report on the representation of Indians in the public services. In the Madras session of 1887, Subramania Iyer was appointed member of the Committee which framed the constitution of the Indian National Congress. During the 1894 Madras session, he was selected as a part of the delegation which presented the case of Indian nationalists before the Secretary of State for India in London. He was met by Gandhi in Pachaiyappa's hall when Gandhi came to Madras for spreading the information on the status of Indians in South Africa, as per the guidance of Sir Pherozeshah mehta. Gandhi mentioned himself this event in his My Experiment with truth. In 1906, he was appointed member of the Standing Committee to promote the objectives of the Indian National Congress. He was one of the founding members of Madras Mahajan Sabha (1884) which coordinated local nationalist effort in Madras Presidency.

When he conducted his widowed daughter's remarriage in 1889, Subramania Iyer was socially boycotted by his own relatives apart from the conservative Mylapore society. Subramania Iyer lost the support of conservative elements who formed a powerful lobby in the Indian National Congress. As a result, he was never elected President of the Indian National Congress nor was he ever elected to the Madras Legislative Council.

== Social reforms ==
Subramania Iyer campaigned vehemently for reforms in Hindu society. He supported widow remarriage and desired to abolish untouchability and child marriages. Subramania Iyer arranged for the remarriage of his eldest daughter, Sivapriyammal, who had been widowed at the age of 13, to a boy in Bombay during the 1889 Congress session.

Subramania Iyer wrote in The Hindu that:

the degraded condition" of Dalits was "notorious and the peculiarities of The Hindu social system are such that from this system no hope whatever of their amelioration can be entertained." It seemed hopeless, he commented, for Dalits "to expect redemption from anything that The Hindu might do" and "no amount of admiration for our religion will bring social salvation to these poor people.

He realised the importance of speaking in the local language and addressed the masses in Tamil in his public lectures. He encouraged Subramaniya Bharathi in his early years and sheltered him in his house.

== Later life and death ==
In 1898, Subramania Iyer relinquished his claims over 'The Hindu' and concentrated his energies on Swadesamitran, the Tamil language newspaper which he had started in 1882. When he left The Hindu in 1898, he made the Swadesamitran, a tri-weekly and, in 1899, a daily, the first in Tamil.

Subramania Aiyar's pen "dipped in a paste of the extra-pungent thin green chillies" – as Subramania Bharati described his Editor's writing style – got him in trouble with the British in 1908. He suffered jail terms and persecutions which gradually broke his health.

In his later years, Subramania Iyer was diagnosed with leprosy and succumbed to the disease on 18 April 1916.

== Biographies ==
- S. A. Govindarajan (1969). Builders of modern India. Publications Division, Ministry of Information and Broadcasting, Govt. of India.
- G.Subramania Iyer: his life and career with an introduction. 1900.

Preceded by None	Managing-Director of The Hindu; 1878–1898	Succeeded by M. Veeraraghavachariar
Preceded by None	Editor of The Hindu; 1878–1898	Succeeded by C. Karunakara Menon
