= S. Srinivasa Raghavaiyangar =

- Born: Sesha Iyengar Srinivasa Raghavaiyangar; 18 July 1849; Gangadharapuram, Tanjore district, Tamil Nadu
- Died: 11 December 1903 (aged 54)
- Occupation: Diwan of Baroda

Diwan Bahadur Sesha Iyengar Srinivasa Raghavaiyangar CIE (18 July 1849 – 11 December 1903) was an Indian civil servant and administrator who served as the Diwan of Baroda from 15 July 1896 to 2 October 1901. He was the elder brother of Indian journalist, Kasturi Ranga Iyengar.

== Early life ==
Srinivasa Raghavaiyengar was born on 18 July 1849 in Gangadharapuram, Tanjore district. His ancestors had served as high-ranking officials in the courts of Vijayanagar and Thanjavur. He had his education in Madras and graduated in arts.

He served as the Inspector General of Registration in the Madras Presidency during the 1880s and 1890s.

== Magnum opus ==
In July 1890, Srinivasa Raghavaiyangar was commissioned by the then Governor of Madras, Lord Connemara to examine "whether the economic condition of the Madras Presidency has on the whole improved or deteriorated during the last 40 or 50 years of British Administration and of writing a Memorandum on the subject". This project was planned in order to refute claims of exploitation made by Indian nationalists. Srinivasa Raghavaiyangar made a detailed study of the economic condition of the people and in 1893, published his report Memorandum of Progress of the Madras Presidency during the last forty years of British administration considered by many to be his magnum opus.
