= S. Kasturi Ranga Iyengar =

Indian independence activist and journalist

S.Kasturi Ranga Iyengar
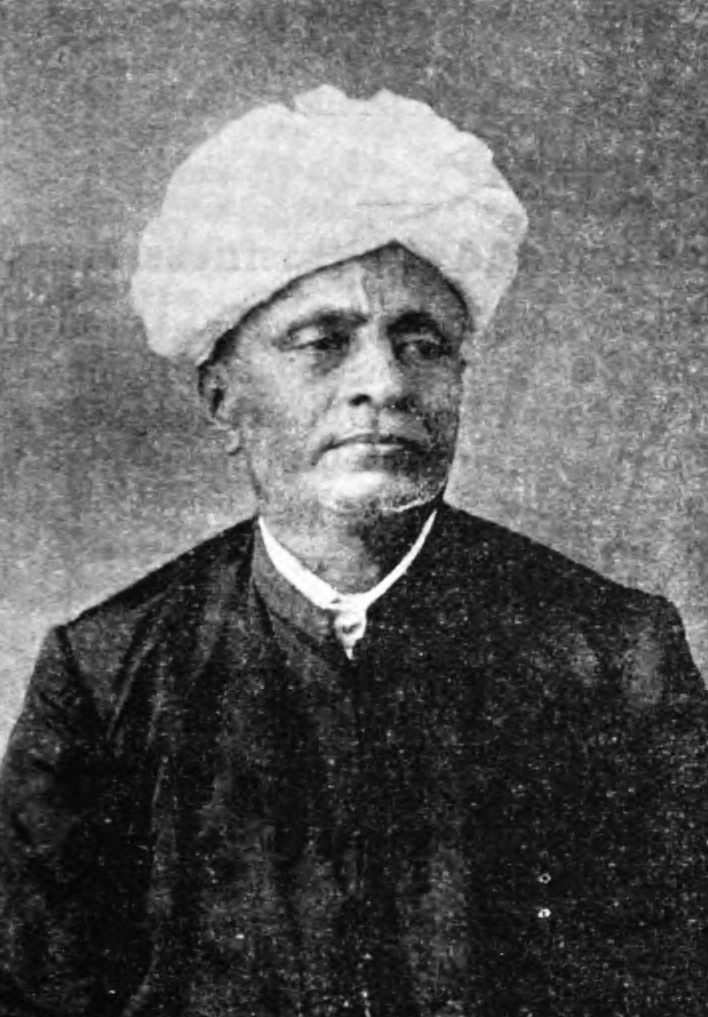
- Born: 15 December 1859; Kumbakonam, Madras Presidency
- Died: 12 December 1923 (aged 63); Madras, British India
- Occupations: lawyer, journalist
- Known for: journalism, political activism
- Children: K. Srinivasan, K. Gopalan

S. Kasturi Ranga Iyengar (15 December 1859 – 12 December 1923) was an Indian lawyer, Indian independence activist, politician and journalist who served as the managing director of The Hindu from 1 April 1905 until his death.

== Ancestry and family ==
Iyengar was born into a family whose paternal forebears came from Kumbakonam, in the Cauvery (Kaveri) delta, in Tanjore District, in British India. His eldest brother, Diwan Bahadur S. Srinivasa Raghavaiyangar, served as the Inspector General of Registration in the Madras Presidency. Srinivasa Raghavaiyangar, in 1893, wrote Memorandum of Progress of the Madras Presidency during the last forty years of British administration to refute the charges of economic exploitation made by nationalists. Yet another elder brother, Soundararaja Iyengar, was the father of Sangeetha Kalanidhi awardee T. Brinda, and he was Deputy Collector in Madras and Kumbhakonam, and was associated with Madras Music Academy. The Music Academy confers an award in the memory of Kasturi Ranga Iyengar.

== Early life ==
Kasturi Ranga Iyengar was born on 15 December 1859 in the village Innambur in Kumbakonam. On completion of his education, he moved to Coimbatore to commence practice as a lawyer. He set up a prosperous vocation and moved to Madras to try his luck there. He was not as successful in Madras as he had been in Coimbatore. Eventually, in 1895, he became a legal correspondent with The Hindu which was run by G. Subramania Iyer. He wrote a well-known column in the newspaper The Coimbatore Letters. During this period, he also got ample encouragement from C. Karunakara Menon.

As The Hindu's financial health declined, the rich and prosperous Kasturi Ranga Iyengar purchased the newspaper for a price of INR 75,000 on 1 April 1905. Iyengar - and under his stewardship, The Hindu, became powerful voices for Indian opinion and independence.

== As managing director ==
In July 1905, Kasturi Ranga Iyengar appointed his nephew A. Rangaswami Iyengar as assistant editor. Kasturi Ranga Iyengar worked to rescue The Hindu by increasing advertisements and terminating subscriptions to customers who did not pay in advance. The tactic proved successful and Kasturi Ranga Iyengar was able to clear his debts by 1910. Kasturi Ranga Iyengar subscribed to the Reuters news service and allotted space for weather reports, court cases, trade and commerce as well as sports. In 1905, The Hindu, in its editorial, demanded partial autonomy but not independence for India. It also strongly criticised Annie Besant and her Theosophical Society, including her lavish promotional campaign of J. Krishnamurti as the Maitreya Buddha. However, The Hindu offered its enthusiastic support to her Home Rule Movement and protested her internment at the orders of Lord Pentland. It also strongly condemned the protests and the resultant killings of Jallianwala Bagh massacre.

== Death ==
Kasturi Ranga Iyengar died on 12 December 1923, three days before his 64th birthday. He was succeeded as editor by his nephew, S. Rangaswami Iyengar. and as managing director of The Hindu by his eldest son, K. Srinivasan.

== Legacy ==
Prior to Kasturi Ranga Iyengar's purchase of The Hindu, he was not much interested in entering public life. Kasturi Ranga Iyengar had the courage to buy a struggling newspaper and embark upon a new enterprise he had no experience in. He was also comparatively new to politics when he made a plunge into the political scenario; yet he was extremely successful for a newcomer. There was always the concern that at some point or the other, he might abandon his anti-British and Indian nationalist attitude. However, this estimation proved to be false. Contemporaries assert that he was just as intelligent and talented as his illustrious brother.

During his tenure as managing-director, Kasturi Ranga Iyengar locked horns with V. Krishnaswami Iyer, Annie Besant and Sir Valentine Chirol, to whom he gave the rejoinder: "I am not here to learn journalistic etiquette from you," when the former made rude comments on the latter. Kasturi Ranga Iyengar also fought with governors Sir Arthur Lawley and Lord Pentland.

Iyengar exerted as much influence by his fabulous wealth as he did with his writing. Instead of being chastised and compelled to undergo ritual cleansing on his arrival from England, he was instead given a grand welcome with all honours by the Vaishnavite orthodoxy.

Iyengar's descendants now own The Hindu Group through their family's company, Kasturi & Sons. Ltd.

== Notes ==
Preceded by M. Veeraraghavachariar	Managing-Director of The Hindu; 1905–1923	Succeeded by K. Srinivasan
Preceded by C. Karunakara Menon	Editor of The Hindu; 1905–1923	Succeeded by S. Rangaswami Iyengar
