= Kasturi Srinivasan =

Indian journalist

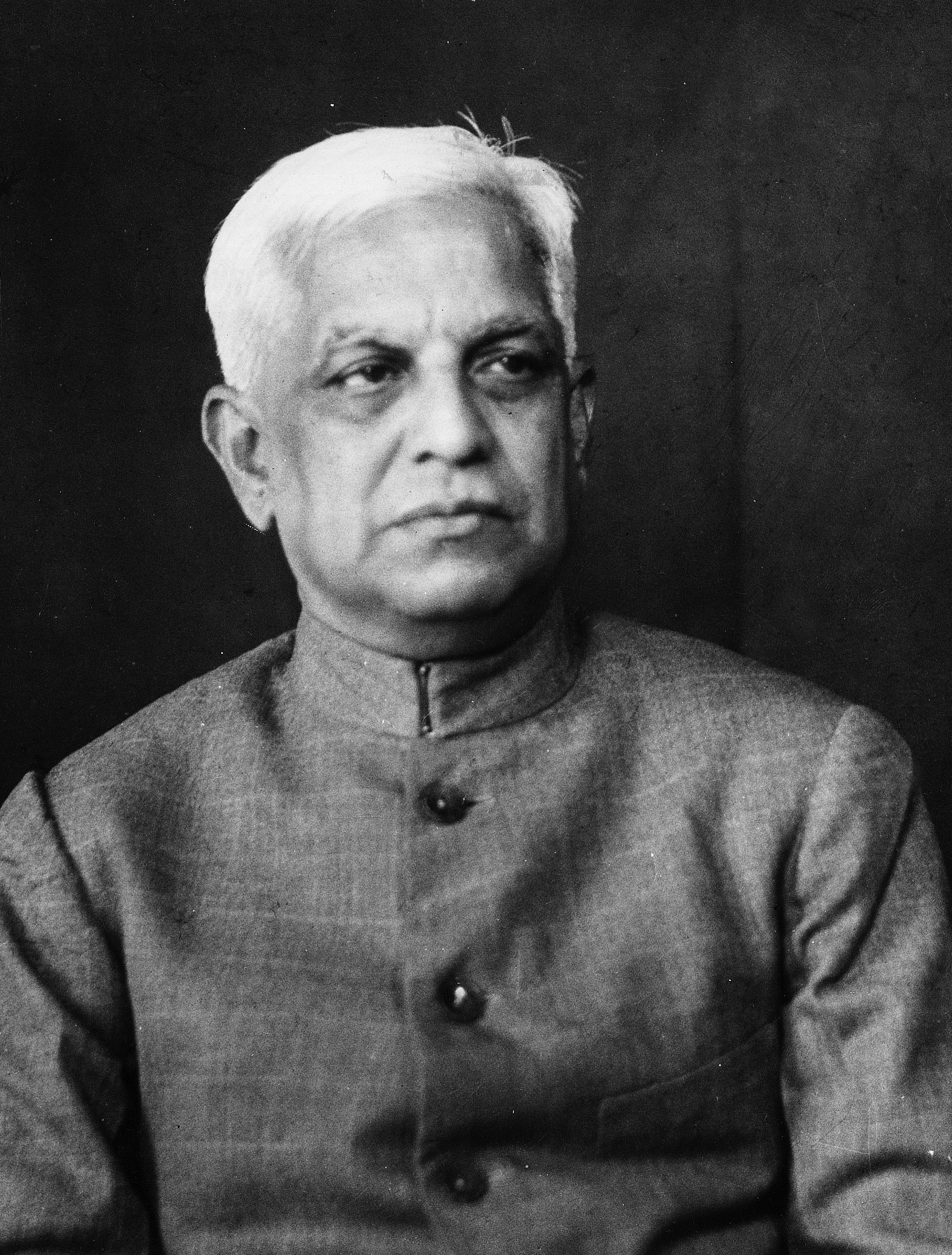
- Born: Kasturi Ranga Iyengar Srinivasan; 7 August 1887; Kumbakonam, Madras Presidency
- Died: 21 June 1959 (aged 71); Madras, India
- Occupation: journalist
- Known for: journalism
- Spouse: Komala Valli
- Children: S.Radha, S.Sembagavalli, S.Parthasarathy, S. Rangarajan
- Awards: Padma Bhushan (1956)

Kasturi Srinivasan (7 August 1887 – 21 June 1959) was an Indian journalist and businessman. He was the eldest son of S. Kasturi Ranga Iyengar.

== Biography ==
Srinivasan was born to well-known lawyer and journalist, S. Kasturi Ranga Iyengar, in August 1887. He graduated from the Presidency College, Madras and joined The Hindu, the newspaper owned by his family, at an early age. He became the Managing Director of The Hindu on the death of Kasturi Ranga Iyengar in 1923 with S. Rangaswami Iyengar as Chief Editor. In February 1934, Srinivasan took over as Chief Editor. He led The Hindu until his death on 21 June 1959.

Srinivasan was a founder-Chairman of the Press Trust of India and was awarded the Padma Bhushan in January 1956. In 1969, he translated the entire work of the Tirukkural into English in verse form.

He had four children – two daughters, S. Radha and S. Champakavalli and two sons, Srinivasan Parthasarathy and S. Rangarajan, both of whom publishers of The Hindu. The immensely popular Parthasarathy, who was Publisher of The Hindu, died shortly after his father at the age of 33. He had a wide circle of friends in The Hindu, India and abroad. Rangarajan died in 2007 and was, in addition to his position in The Hindu, an international dog judge and film producer.

== See also ==
- List of translators into English
