= The Hindu =

English-language daily newspaper in India

- Front page of The Hindu for 16 March 2005
- Type: Daily newspaper
- Format: Broadsheet
- Owners: The Hindu Group; Kasturi and Sons Limited, Kasturi family
- Founder(s): G. Subramania Iyer; Nyapathi Subba Rao Pantulu; M. Veeraraghavachariar
- Publisher: Nirmala Lakshman
- Editor: Suresh Nambath
- Founded: 20 September 1878; 148 years ago
- Political alignment: Centre-left; Secular; Social liberal
- Language: English
- Headquarters: Chennai, Tamil Nadu, India
- Country: India
- Circulation: 1,400,000 daily (as of August 2025)
- Price: ₹12 (13¢ US) (weekdays); ₹15 (16¢ US) (weekends)
- ISSN: 0971-751X
- OCLC number: 13119119
- Website: thehindu.com

The Hindu is an Indian English-language daily newspaper owned by The Hindu Group, headquartered in Chennai, Tamil Nadu. It was founded as a weekly publication in 1878 by the Triplicane Six, becoming a daily in 1889. It is one of the Indian newspapers of record. As of March 2018, The Hindu is published from 21 locations across 11 states of India.

The Hindu has been a family-owned newspaper since 1905, when it was purchased by S. Kasturi Ranga Iyengar from the original founders. It is now jointly owned by Iyengar's descendants (locally referred to as "The Hindu Family"), who serve as the directors of the holding company.

Except for a period of around two years, when S. Varadarajan held editorship of the newspaper, senior editorial positions of the paper have always been held by members of the original Iyengar family or by those appointed by them under their direction.

== History ==
=== Early years ===
The Hindu was founded in Madras on 20 September 1878 as a weekly newspaper, by what was known then as the Triplicane Six, which consisted of four law students and two teachers: T.T. Rangacharya, P. V. Rangacharya, D. Kesava Rao Pantulu and N. Subba Rao Pantulu, led by G. Subramania Iyer (a schoolteacher from Tanjore district) and M. Veeraraghavacharyar (a lecturer at Pachaiyappa's College).

=== Kasturi Ranga Iyengar ===
The partnership between Veeraraghavachariar and Subramania Iyer was dissolved in October 1898. Iyer quit the paper, leaving Veeraraghavachariar as sole owner; he appointed C. Karunakara Menon as editor. However, The Hindu's adventurousness began to decline in the 1900s and so did its circulation, which was down to 800 copies when the sole proprietor decided to sell out. The purchaser was The Hindu's Legal Adviser from 1895, S. Kasturi Ranga Iyengar.

== Management ==
Over the course of its history, the family of Kasturi Ranga Iyengar has usually run The Hindu through the presence of members in editorial and business operations, as well as on the Board. It was headed by G. Kasturi from 1965 to 1991, N. Ravi from 1991 to 2003, and by his brother, N. Ram, from 27 June 2003 to 18 January 2011.

As of 2010, there were 12 directors in the board of Kasturi & Sons.

=== Later developments ===
In 1987–88, The Hindu's coverage of the Bofors arms deal scandal, a series of document-backed exclusives, set the terms of the national political discourse on this subject. The Bofors scandal broke in April 1987 with Swedish Radio alleging that bribes had been paid to top Indian political leaders, officials and Indian Army officers in return for the Swedish arms manufacturing company winning a hefty contract with the Government of India for the purchase of 155 mm howitzers. During a six-month period, the newspaper published scores of copies of original papers that documented the secret payments, amounting to $50 million, into Swiss bank accounts, the agreements behind the payments, communications relating to the payments and the crisis response, and other material. The investigation was led by a part-time correspondent of The Hindu, Chitra Subramaniam, reporting from Geneva, and was supported by Ram in Chennai. The scandal was a major embarrassment to the party in power at the centre, the Indian National Congress, and its leader Prime Minister Rajiv Gandhi. The paper's editorial accused the Prime Minister of being party to massive fraud and cover-up.

In 1991, Deputy Editor N. Ravi, Ram's younger brother, replaced G. Kasturi as editor. Nirmala Lakshman, Kasturi Srinivasan's granddaughter and the first woman in the company to hold an editorial or managerial role, became Joint Editor of The Hindu and her sister, Malini Parthasarathy, Executive Editor.

In 2003, the Jayalalithaa government of the state of Tamil Nadu, of which Chennai is the capital, filed cases against The Hindu for breach of privilege of the state legislative body. The move was perceived as a government's assault on freedom of the press, and the paper garnered support from the journalistic community.

Joint managing director N. Murali said in July 2003, "It is true that our readers have been complaining that some of our reports are partial and lack objectivity. But it also depends on reader beliefs." N. Ram was appointed on 27 June 2003 as its editor-in-chief with a mandate to "improve the structures and other mechanisms to uphold and strengthen quality and objectivity in news reports and opinion pieces", authorised to "restructure the editorial framework and functions in line with the competitive environment". On 3 and 23 September 2003, the reader's letters column carried responses from readers saying the editorial was biased. An editorial in August 2003 observed that the newspaper was affected by the "editorialising as news reporting" virus, and expressed a determination to buck the trend, restore the professionally sound lines of demarcation, and strengthen objectivity and factuality in its coverage.

In 2010, The Indian Express reported a dispute within the publisher of The Hindu regarding the retirement age of the person working as the editor-in-chief, a post which was then being served by N. Ram. Following this report, Ram decided to sue The Indian Express for defamation, a charge which the Indian Express denied. N. Ravi and Parthasarathy voiced concern about Ram's decision, saying that doing so goes against The Hindu's values and that journalists should not fear "scrutiny", respectively. During subsequent events, Malini Parthasarathy tweeted that "issues relating to management of newspaper have come to the surface, including editorial direction" in her response to a question. Later, she called N. Ram and other The Hindu employees "Stalinists", alleging that they were trying to oust her from the newspaper.

In 2011, during the resignation of N. Ram, the newspaper became the subject of a succession battle between the members of the Kasturi family. Ram had appointed Siddharth Varadarajan as his successor as the editor-in-chief of the newspaper who justified the appointment on the ostensible basis of separation of ownership and management, which was opposed by N. Ravi as it deviated from the publication's tradition of family members retaining editorial control over it. Varadarajan was subsequently accused by dissident family members of being left leaning and the matter of Varadarajan's appointment was brought in front of the board of directors of the parent company, Kasturi & Sons. During the dispute, Narasimhan Murali alleged that N. Ram ran The Hindu "like a banana republic, with cronyism and vested interests ruling the roost". In the end, the board voted 6–6 over a review of the appointment, the tie was broken by a deciding vote from Ram in his capacity as chairman of the company and in favor of his decision.

On 2 April 2013 The Hindu started "The Hindu in School" with S. Shivakumar as editor. A new edition for young readers, it is distributed through schools as part of The Hindu's "Newspaper in Education" programme. It covers the day's important news developments, features, sports, and regional news. On 16 September 2013, The Hindu Group launched its Tamil-language edition with K. Ashokan as editor.

On 21 October 2013, changes were made in Editorial as well as business of The Hindu.

For the first time since its founding in 1878, The Hindu did not publish a print edition in the Chennai market on 2 December, as workers could not reach the press building due to the 2015 South Indian floods.

== Notable editors ==
Editors include:

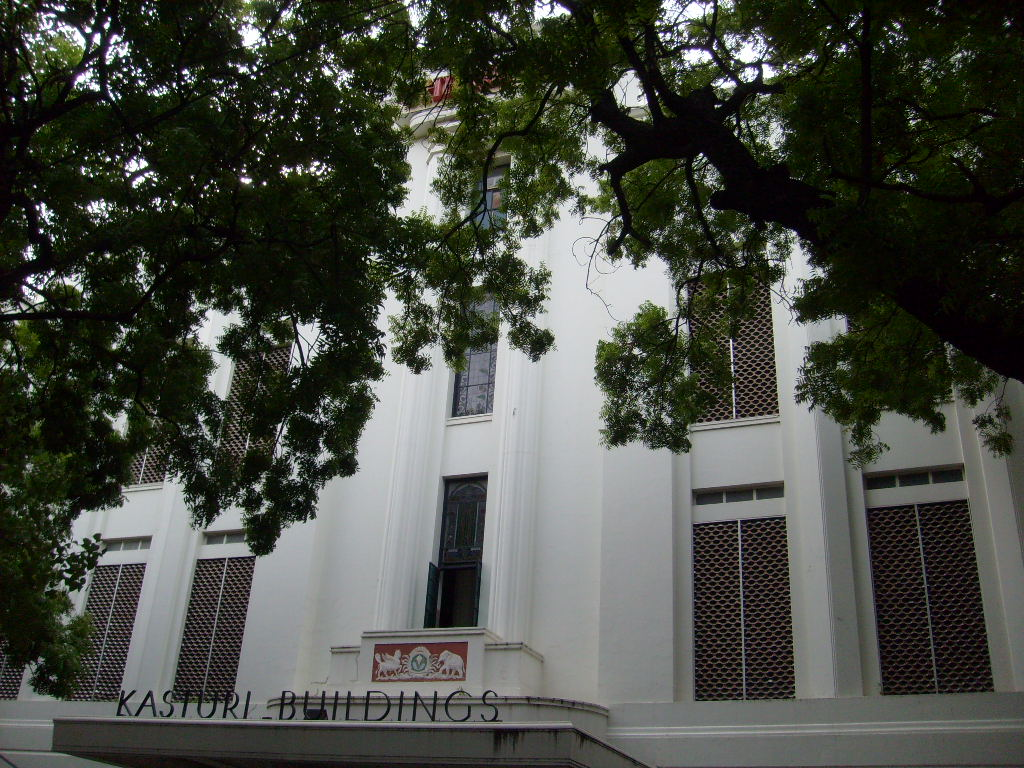
A close-up view of the entrance to Kasturi Buildings, the head office of The Hindu

- M. Veeraraghavachariar (1878–1904)
- S. Kasturi Ranga Iyengar (1904–1923)
- K. Srinivasan (1923–1959)
- G. Narasimhan (1959–1977)
- N. Ram (1977–2011)
- K. Balaji (2011–2012)
- G. Subramania Iyer (1878–1898)
- C. Karunakara Menon (1898–1905)
- S. Kasturi Ranga Iyengar (1905–1923)
- S. Rangaswami Iyengar (1923–1926)
- A. Rangaswami Iyengar (1928–1934)
- S. Parthasarathy (1959–1965)
- G. Kasturi (1965–1991)
- N. Ravi (1991–2003)
- N. Ram (2003–2011)
- Siddharth Varadarajan (2011–2013)
- N. Ravi (2013–2015)
- Malini Parthasarathy (2015–2016)
- Mukund Padmanabhan (2016–2019)
- Suresh Nambath (2019–)

== Online presence ==
The Hindu, the first newspaper in India to have a website, launched its website at thehindu.com in 1995.

On 15 August 2009, the 130-year-old newspaper launched the beta version of its redesigned website at beta.thehindu.com. This was the first redesign of its website since its launch. On 24 June 2010 the beta version of the website went live.

On 15 August 2022, for the first time in its 144-year-old history, The Hindu started publishing Hindi-translated editorials on its website.

== Criticism and scandals ==
On 5 January 2016, The Hindu reported the story on the Sengol (a sceptre from the nation’s independence in 1947), was just fiction based on manufactured lies, leading to the Sengol controversy. Malini Parthasarathy engaged in discussion with Rashtriya Swayamsevak Sangh ideologue S. Gurumurthy regarding The Hindu and its fact-checking of the Sengol controversy. The newspaper had contradicted the Union government's claim that the Sengol was presented to then-Prime Minister Jawaharlal Nehru by Lord Mountbatten, the last Viceroy of India. Gurumurthy contested the findings of the fact-checking article, and Malini continued as a Director of Kasturi & Sons Ltd. In July 2020, she became the chairperson of the Group. On 5 June 2023, she stepped down upon completing her non-extendable three-year term as chairperson, and Nirmala Lakshman was unanimously appointed as chairperson.

On January 25, 2018, The Hindu reported that INS Arihant's propulsion compartment was damaged after water entered it, as a hatch on the rear side was left open by mistake. The submarine has no hatches there. The Arihant is based on Russian double hull design with a sealed nuclear reactor section. The report raises doubts among experts.

On 25 January 2012, Mr. K.C. Palaniswamy, a former AIADMK Member of Parliament registered a complaint against N. Ram, the owner of The Hindu and 8 other directors of KSL(Kasturi and Sons Ltd), the parent company of The Hindu with the Chennai police, accusing them of a 400-acre land grab scam, worth nearly ₹3 billion. Ram filed and received an anticipatory bail in the case.

On September 12, 2026, The Hindu and Dainik Bhaskar published full-page advertisements titled "What is Dera Sacha Sauda? (Facts vs Fiction)" defending spiritual leader and convict Gurmeet Ram Rahim Singh, and further portraying him as a social reformer. The advertisements, claimed that Singh had been targeted through false cases and witnesses and defended his repeated paroles and furloughs as being within legal provisions. Although both newspapers included disclaimers stating that they had no editorial or journalistic involvement in the advertisements, they were met with backlash for their decision to publish the piece. The Hindu's ad on Gurmeet Ram Rahim raised questions on ad revenue that can undermine editorial ethics and accountability in Indian journalism.

On September 12, 2026, The Hindu posted an alleged video claiming “Here’s what’s on the breakfast for world leaders attending the BRICS Summit in New Delhi” but according to The Ministry of External Affairs official fact-checking handle known as MEA FactCheck clarified that no breakfast was served to world leaders at the summit venue.

== Editorial policy and reputation ==
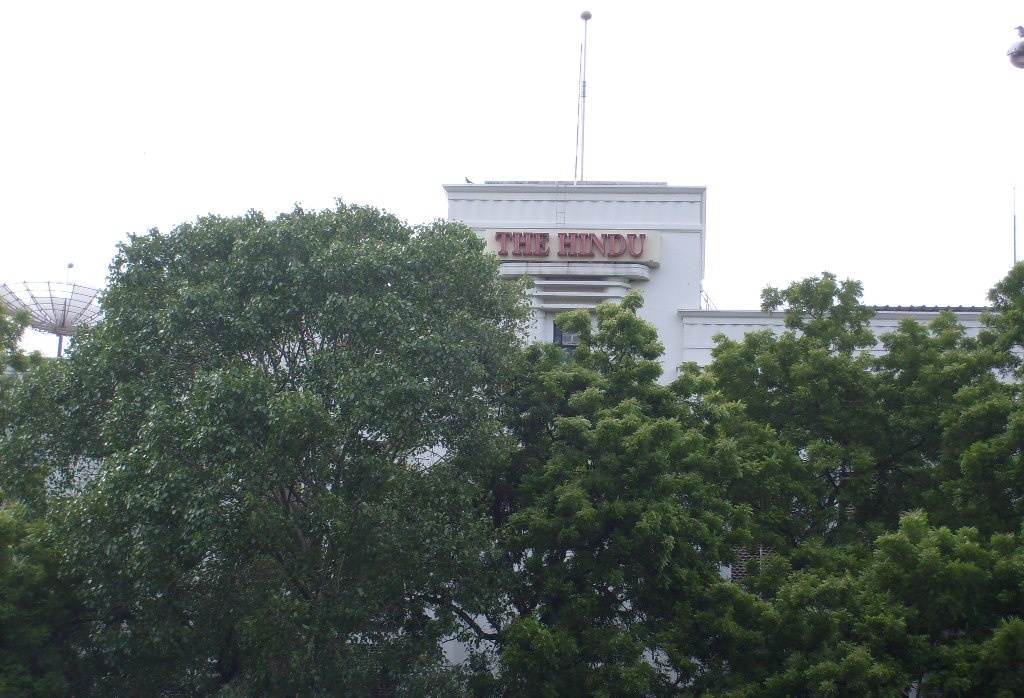
Headquarters of The Hindu in Anna Salai, Chennai

Its editorial stances have earned it the nickname, the "Maha Vishnu of Mount Road". "From the new address, 100 Mount Road, which was to remain The Hindu's home till 1939, there issued a quarto-size paper with a front-page full of advertisements—a practice that came to an end only in 1958 when it followed the lead of its idol, the pre-Thomson Times [London]—and three back pages also at the service of the advertiser. In between, there were more views than news."

In 1965, The Times listed The Hindu as one of the world's ten best newspapers. Discussing each of its choices in separate articles, The Times wrote: "The Hindu takes the general seriousness to lengths of severity... published in Madras, it is the only newspaper which in spite of being published only in a provincial capital is regularly and attentively read in Delhi. It is read not only as a distant and authoritative voice on national affairs but as an expression of the most liberal—and least provincial—southern attitudes... Its Delhi Bureau gives it outstanding political and economic dispatches and it carries regular and frequent reports from all state capitals, so giving more news from states, other than its own, than most newspapers in India...However, most news is from the southern states. It might fairly be described as a southern newspaper. The Hindu can claim to be the most respected paper in India."

In 1968, the American Newspaper Publishers Association awarded The Hindu its World Press Achievement Award.

A 2014 article in the Indian Journal of Pharmacology praised The Hindu's ongoing journalism and critique of clinical trials in India.

== See also ==
- The Hindu Business Line
- Frontline magazine
- List of newspapers in India
- List of newspapers in India by readership
- The Hindu Literary Prize
- Lit for Life
- Sportstar
