= Dakshina Patha Palayam =

- village
- Country: India
- State: Tamil Nadu
- District: Vellore

Languages
- Time zone: UTC+5:30 (IST)
- Postal code: 632603
- Vehicle registration: TN-23 BQ
- Coastline: 140 kilometres (87 mi)

Dakshina Patha Pathapalem, sometimes shortened to D.P. Palayam, is a village located in Gudiyattam Taluk in the Vellore district, Tamil Nadu, India. It is located approximately 1 km (0.62 mi) from the border with Andhra Pradesh and 4 km (2.5 mi) from Paradarami. It is a small village and has about 50 other villages surrounding it. The official languages are Telugu and Tamil. The village is surrounded by hills on all the sides and has an old temple—Veera Vijaya Anjaneya Swamy Temple—which has been renovated.

The village lies between Gudiyatham and Chittoor. It is 18 km (11 mi) from Gudiyattam and 24 km (15 mi) from Chittoor. From Paradarami one can reach D.P. Palayam by Tamil Nadu State Transport Corporation town service buses, the Andhra Pradesh State Road Transport Corporation buses, and Kalaimagal Transport private bus, and also a number of shared auto services frequently available for public transportation.

The D.P.Palayam panchayat comprises Arigavaripalli, Agraharam, Dasarapalli, Gangapuram, and Thanneerpandhal. The six-lane national highway NH7 is about 25 km (16 mi) from D.P. Palayam. The four-lane highway NH4 is about 25 km (16 mi) from D.P. Palayam. The nearest school is Government Higher Secondary School for Boys and Girls located in Paradarami. The nearest Government Hospital is located in Paradarami, Gudiyatham and Chittoor. The nearest bordered town is Chittoor.

State Highway 88, which is about a 41 km (25 mi) stretch from Gudiyatham to Chittoor, plays a major role in heavy vehicle goods transportation. Majority of the heavy goods vehicles passes through this route. Travelers can join the National High Way NH4 from D.P. Palayam via D K Cheruvu and Bangarupalem.

The major occupation of the village is agriculture. Mango, Sugarcane, Paddy (unmilled rice) and other vegetables are cultivated here and transported to the nearby markets called Ulavar Santhai in Tamil in Gudiyattam or Raithu Bazar in Chittoor. Cattle and milk production is also one of the main sources and most of the people in the village takes care of agriculture along with Cattle farming.

Dakshina Patha Palayam belongs to Gudiyattam Taluk. The recent amendment was included in K V Kuppam assembly constituency and is also a part of Vellore Lok Sabha constituency. Kalvi Arignar Kamarajar was elected as a member of the Legislative Assembly from the Gudiyatham constituency when he was the chief minister of Tamil Nadu.

== Assembly Segments ==
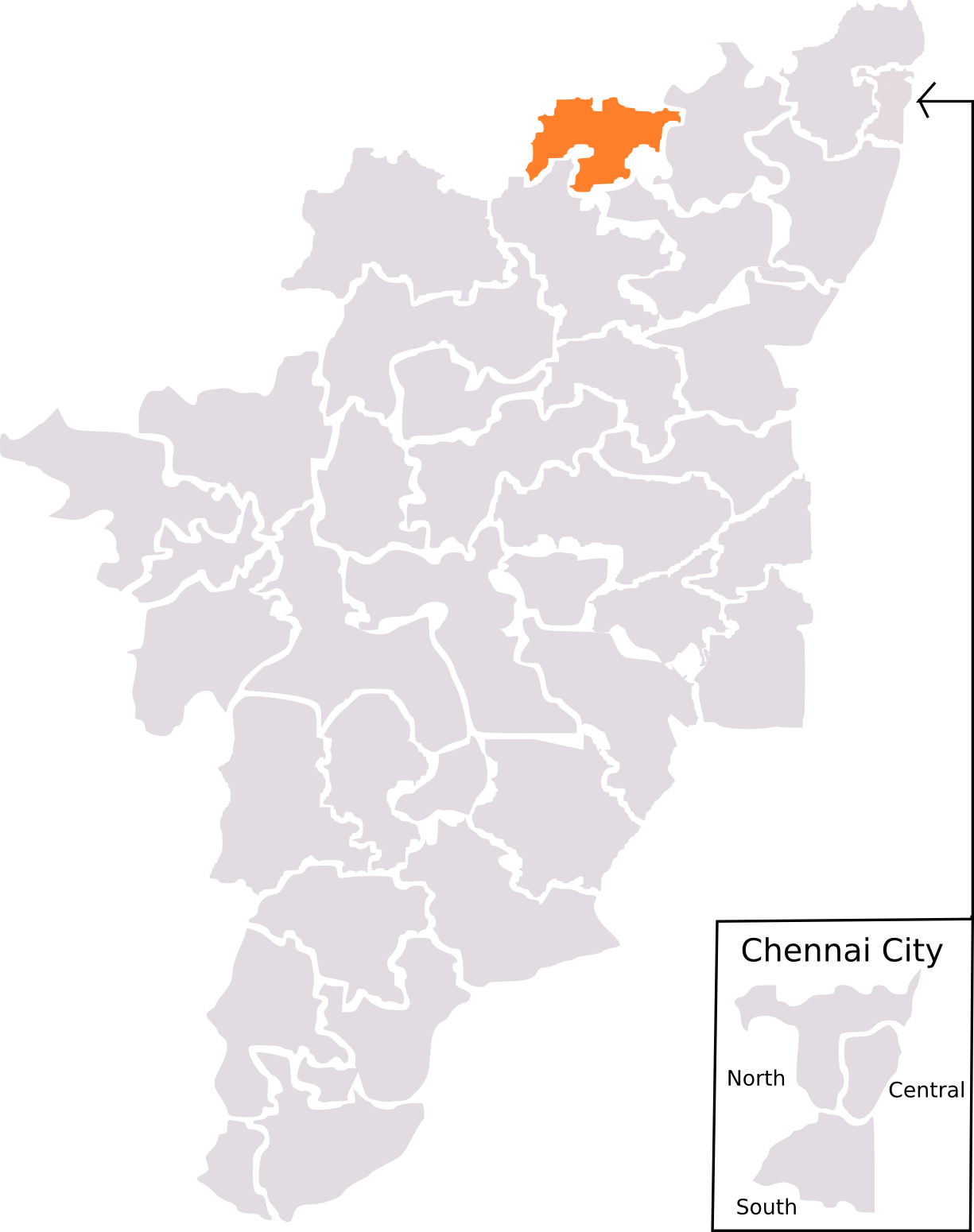
Vellore constituency as laid out by 1971 Delimitation. The boundaries for this constituency lasted until 2004 election, which was then replaced by 2008 Delimitation.

Vellore changed 1.1.09 (Arni Lok sabha) Lok Sabha constituency was composed of the following assembly segments.

1. Katpadi
2. Gudiyatham
3. Pernambut (SC)
4. Anaicut
5. Vellore
6. Arni

After delimitation, it is currently composed of

1. Vellore
2. Anaicut
3. Kilvazhithunaiankuppam (SC)
4. Gudiyatham
5. Vaniyambadi
6. Ambur

== Gallery ==
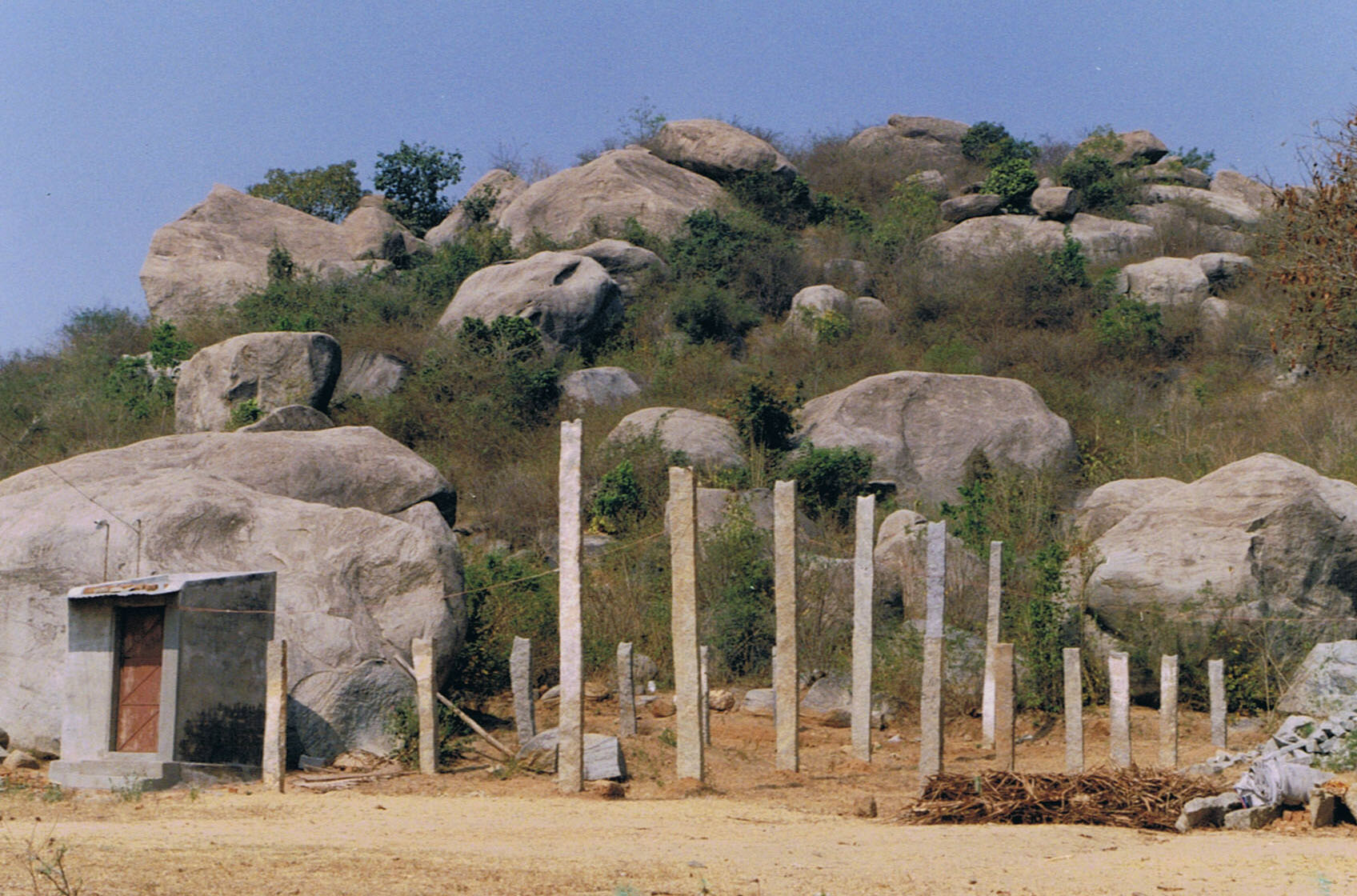
Store room before building

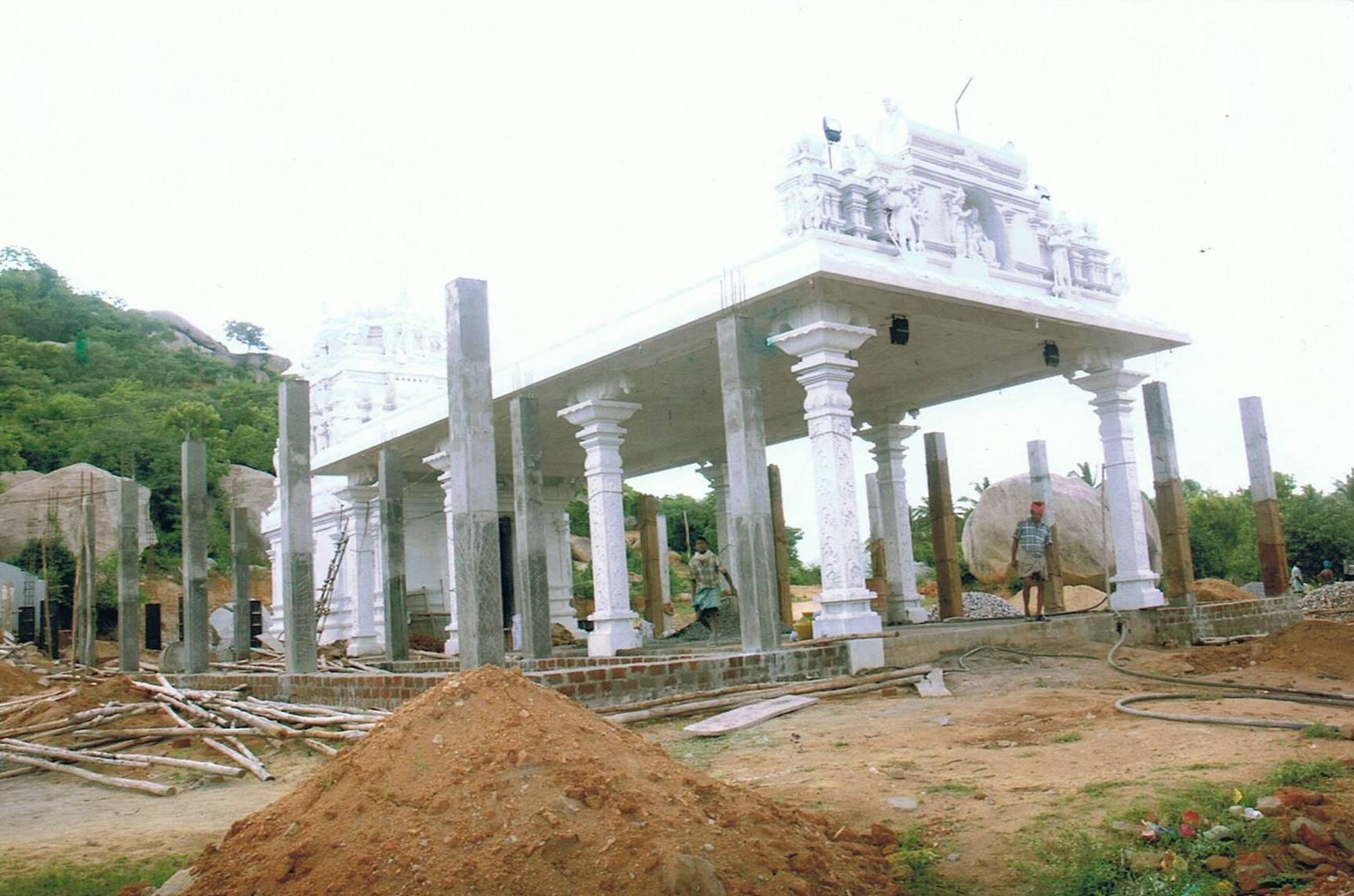
Temple without the compound wall and the main gopuram.

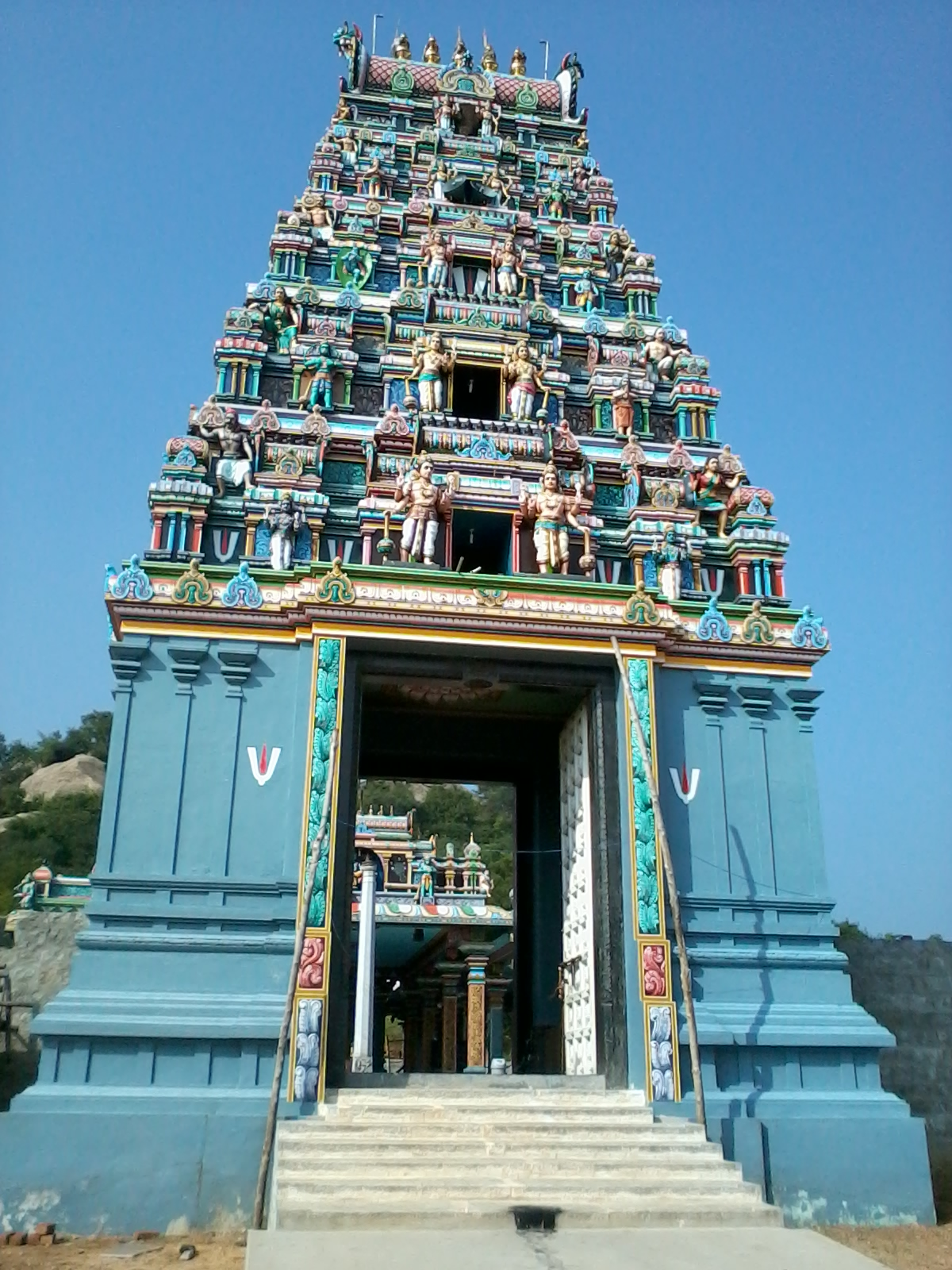
A view of temple gopuram

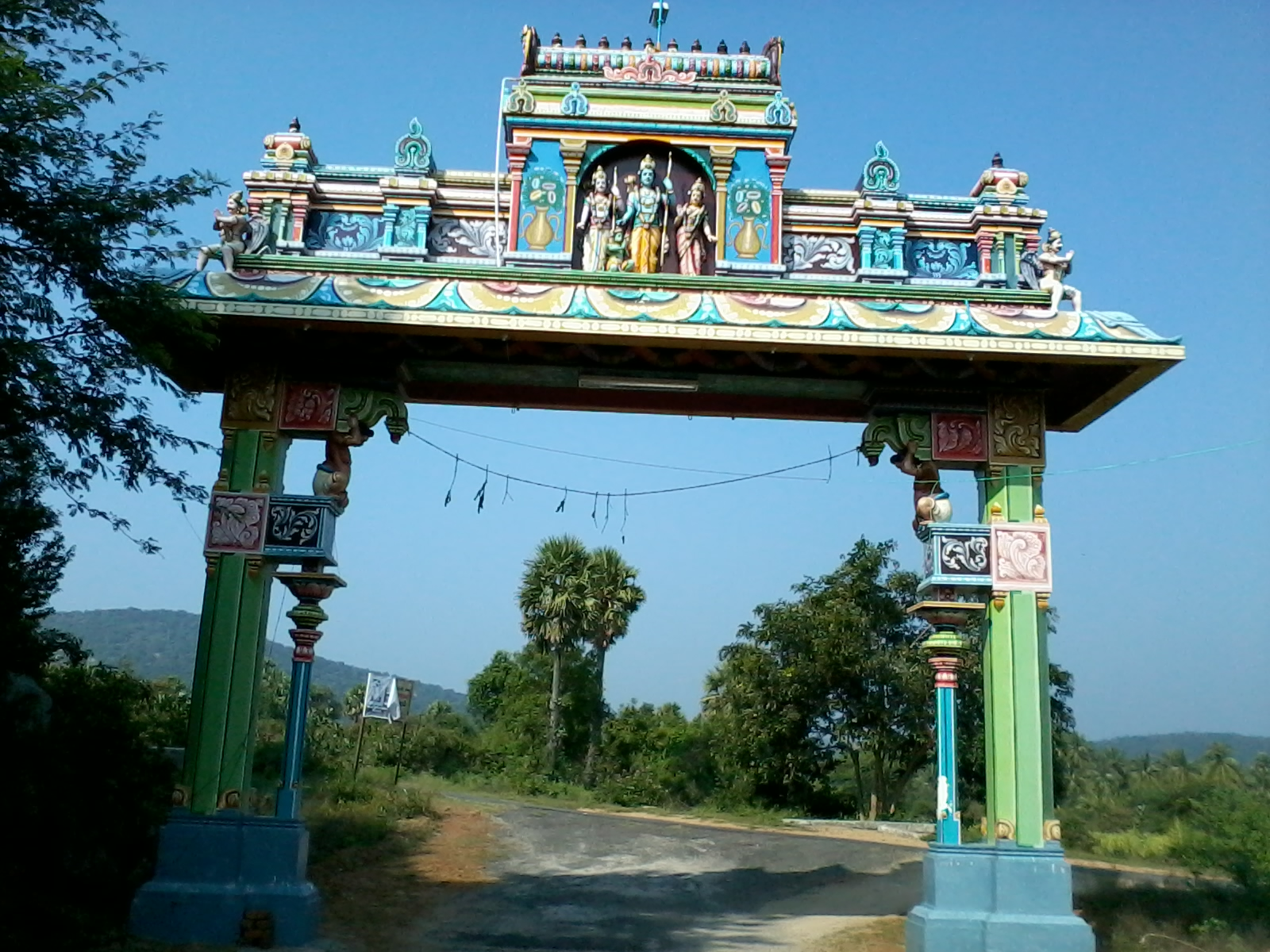
Temple Arch from the entrance
