= A. K. Ranganathan =

Member Tamil Nadu Legislative Assembly
- In office 1977–1980
- Preceded by: M. P. Sarathi
- Succeeded by: V. M. Devaraj
- Constituency: Vellore

Personal details
- Born: 1937 (age 88–89) Marungur
- Party: All India Anna Dravida Munnetra Kazhagam
- Profession: Politics

A. K. Ranganathan is an Indian politician and a former Member of the Tamil Nadu Legislative Assembly. He was elected as a member of the All India Anna Dravida Munnetra Kazhagam in the 1971 Tamil Nadu legislative assembly elections from Vellore Assembly constituency.

== Electoral performance ==
=== 1977 ===
1977 Tamil Nadu Legislative Assembly election: Vellore
Party	Candidate	Votes	%	±%
AIADMK	A. K. Ranganathan	26,590	30.47%	New
JP	A. K. Lalalajpathy	25,758	29.52%	New
DMK	V. M. Devaraj	21,229	24.33%	−28.52
INC	V. Dakshinamoorthy	12,043	13.80%	−30.14
Independent	G. Moorthv	1,064	1.22%	New
Margin of victory		832	0.95%	−7.95%
Turnout		87,258	67.63%	−3.80%
Registered electors		130,154		
AIADMK gain from DMK		Swing	-22.38%	
