= K. Lingamuthu =

Indian politician

Member of the Tamil Nadu Legislative Assembly
- In office 2011–2016
- Constituency: Gudiyatham

Personal details
- Party: Communist Party of India

K. Lingamuthu is an Indian politician and was a member of the 14th Tamil Nadu Legislative Assembly from the Gudiyatham constituency. He represented the Communist Party of India.

The elections of 2016 resulted in his constituency being won by C. Jayanthi Padmanabhan.

== Electoral performance ==
Election	Constituency	Political party	Result	Vote %	Opposition			Ref
Election	Constituency	Political party	Result	Vote %	Candidate	Political party	Vote %	Ref
2011	Gudiyatham	CPI	Won	49.07%	K. Rajamarthandan	DMK	45.46%	
2016	Gudiyatham	CPI	Lost	1.61%	C. Jayanthi Padmanabhan	AIADMK	48.56%	
