= V. S. Vijay =

Indian politician

V. S. Vijay is an Indian politician and was a member of the 14th Tamil Nadu Legislative Assembly from Vellore constituency. He represented the All India Anna Dravida Munnetra Kazhagam party.

Vijay holds an orthopaedics degree and was the Minister for Health in the Government of Tamil Nadu. He defeated the former MLA, C. Gnanasekaran, who held the Vellore constituency for about 20 years by Charan Kumar.

The elections of 2016 resulted in his constituency being won by P. Karthikeyan.
