= Gnanasekaran =

Gnanasekaran is a given name. Notable people with the name include:

- C. Gnanasekaran, Indian politician
- Ramaswamy Gnanasekaran (born 1954), Indian sprinter
- Sathiyan Gnanasekaran (born 1993), Indian intelligence officer
