= Meenoor =

Meenur Meenur Lord Venkateshwara Hill
- Village
- Interactive map of Meenur
- Coordinates: 12°58′51″N 78°50′14″E
- Country: India
- State: Tamil Nadu
- District Vellore: Vellore

Government
  - Type: Panchayat

Languages
  - Official: Tamil
- Time zone: UTC+5:30 (IST)
- Vehicle registration: TN-

Meenur is a village in Gudiyattam taluk, Vellore district, Tamil Nadu, India. Tamil is the spoken language.
