= Gudiyatham east =

Gudiyatham East Rural
- Region in Gudiyatham
- Nickname: land of forests
- Location in Tamil Nadu, India
- Coordinates: 12.93972°N 78.8644°E
- Country: India
- State: Tamil Nadu
- District: Vellore
- Founder: Kulothunga Cholan

Government
  - Type: First Grade Municipality (Sub District)
  - Body: Gudiyattam Municipality

Area
  - Total: 82.46 km^{2} (31.84 sq mi)

Languages =Tamil, Telugu, Urdu
  - Official: Tamil, English
- Time zone: UTC+5:30 (IST)
- Postal code: 632601,632602,632603,632604,635 803,635806,635805,635813.
- Telephone codes: +91 ,04171
- Vehicle registration: TN 23

Gudiyatham east is a region within Gudiyatham, Vellore district in the Indian state of Tamil Nadu. The region is known for its caves, mountains and temples. The inhabitants of the area mainly depend on agriculture and tourism.

== Tourism ==
- The Koundinya Wildlife Sanctuary is situated in the area and is a famous destination spot for tourists. The sanctuary is richly populated with indigenous trees and wild animals
- A large biodiversity park is being set up in 85 acres of land in Gudiyattam taluk, which will be run by the Horticulture Department. The ground in Agaramcheri village is currently being cleared ahead of the construction of the park. Once finished, the park will feature many species of trees, including a section for Sthala Vriksha, a monumental trees found in South Indian temples. World class facilities are planned for visitors and their stay at the park, and it is being expected to improve tourism in the district.
- Many Shukra, Buddhist and Chandra temples are situated in the area.
- Genganna sirasu is also a famous waterfall in this area.

== See also ==
- Katpadi
- gudiyatham
