= Gudiyatham Assembly constituency =

State Legislative Assembly Constituency in Tamil Nadu

Coordinates: 12.95°N 78.88°E

Gudiyatham
- Constituency No. 46 for the Tamil Nadu Legislative Assembly

Constituency details
- Country: India
- Region: South India
- State: Tamil Nadu
- District: Vellore
- Lok Sabha constituency: Vellore
- Established: 1951
- Total electors: 2,52,064
- Reservation: SC

Member of Legislative Assembly
- 17th Tamil Nadu Legislative Assembly
- Incumbent K. Sindhu
- Party: TVK
- Elected year: 2026

Gudiyatham or 'Gudiyattam' is a state assembly constituency in Tamil Nadu, India. Its State Assembly Constituency number is 46. It comprises portions of the Gudiyattam and Vaniyambadi taluks and is a part of Vellore Lok Sabha constituency for national elections. The seat is reserved for candidates from the Scheduled Castes. It is one of the 234 State Legislative Assembly Constituencies in Tamil Nadu in India.

== Members of Legislative Assembly ==
Year	Member	Political party
Madras State
1952	A. J. Arunachala Mudaliar	Indian National Congress
1954	K. Kamarajar	Indian National Congress
1957	V. K. Kothandaraman	Communist Party of India
1962	T. Manavalan	Indian National Congress
1967	V. K. Kothandaraman	Communist Party of India (Marxist)
Tamil Nadu
1971	E. K. Duraiswamy	Dravida Munnetra Kazhagam
1977	V. K. Gothandaraman	Communist Party of India (Marxist)
1980	K. R. Sundaram	Communist Party of India (Marxist)
1984	R. Govindasamy	Indian National Congress
1989	K. R. Sundaram	Communist Party of India (Marxist)
1991	V. Dhandayuthapani	Indian National Congress
1996	V. G. Dhanapal	Dravida Munnetra Kazhagam
2001	C. M. Suryakala	All India Anna Dravida Munnetra Kazhagam
2006	G. Latha	Communist Party of India (Marxist)
2011	K. Lingamuthu	Communist Party of India
2016	C. Jayanthi Padmanabhan	All India Anna Dravida Munnetra Kazhagam
2019^	S. Kathavarayan	Dravida Munnetra Kazhagam
2021	V. Amulu	Dravida Munnetra Kazhagam
2026	K. Sindhu	Tamilaga Vettri Kazhagam

== Election results ==
Vote share of winning candidates
2026	36.17%
2021	47.83%
2019 by-election	52.05%
2016	48.56%
2011	49.07%
2006	39.70%
2001	57.05%
1996	48.62%
1991	64.41%
1989	23.46%
1984	39.15%
1980	43.87%
1977	29.54%
1971	56.38%
1967	61.21%
1962	44.97%
1957	21.78%
1952	20.13%

=== 2026 ===
2026 Tamil Nadu Legislative Assembly election: Gudiyatham
Party	Candidate	Votes	%	±%
TVK	K. Sindhu	82,858	36.17	New
DMDK	K. B. Pradap	72,761	31.76	New
AIADMK	Paritha Purushothaman. G	64,122	27.99	▼16.55
NTK	J. Emalan	5,802	2.53	▼3.11
NOTA	NOTA	799	0.35	▼0.46
BSP	T. Poovarasan	697	0.30	▲0.06
Independent	Subakaran. A	519	0.23	New
Independent	Bharath Mathiruban	400	0.17	New
PT	K. Asha	383	0.17	New
All India Puratchi Thalaivar Makkal Munnetra Kazhagam	K. Thabithal	351	0.15	New
Independent	A. Rajesh	227	0.10	New
Independent	M. Sumathi	157	0.07	New
Margin of victory		10,097	4.41	▲1.12
Turnout		2,29,076	90.88	▲18.41
Registered electors		2,52,064		▼37,613
TVK gain from DMK		Swing	▲36.17	

=== 2021 ===
2021 Tamil Nadu Legislative Assembly election: Gudiyatham
Party	Candidate	Votes	%	±%
DMK	V. Amulu	100,412	47.83%	▼4.22
AIADMK	G. Paritha	93,511	44.54%	▲6.14
NTK	R. Kalaiyenthiri	11,834	5.64%	5.19%
AMMK	C. Jayanthi Padmanabhan	1,822	0.87%	
NOTA	Nota	1,699	0.81%	−0.34%
BSP	S. Raja	505	0.24%	−0.03%
IJK	C. Rajan	482	0.23%	
Independent	K. Jaikarthikeyan	449	0.21%	
Independent	N. Lakshmipathy	257	0.12%	
Independent	M. Elumalai	168	0.08%	
Independent	P. Gunaseelan	138	0.07%	
Margin of victory		6,901	3.29%	−2.60%
Turnout		209,931	72.47%	−1.64%
Rejected ballots		331	0.16%	
Registered electors		289,677		
DMK hold		Swing	-0.73%	

=== 2019 by-election ===
2019 Tamil Nadu Legislative Assembly by-elections: Gudiyattam
Party	Candidate	Votes	%	±%
DMK	S. Kathavarayan	1,06,137	52.05	
AIADMK	R. Moorthy	78,296	38.40	
AMMK	C. Jayanthi Padmanabhan	8,186	4.01	+4.01
NTK	R. Kalaiyenthiri	4,670	2.29	+2.29
MNM	S. Venkatesan	3,287	1.69	+1.69
NOTA	None of the Above	2,838	1.39	+1.39
Majority		27,841	13.65	
Turnout		2,03,959	75.23	
DMK gain from AIADMK		Swing		

=== 2016 ===
2016 Tamil Nadu Legislative Assembly election: Gudiyatham
Party	Candidate	Votes	%	±%
AIADMK	C. Jayanthi Padmanabhan	94,689	48.56%	
DMK	K. Rajamarthandan	83,219	42.68%	−2.78%
PMK	B. Deepa	7,505	3.85%	
CPI	K. Lingamuthu	3,140	1.61%	
NOTA	None Of The Above	2,241	1.15%	
IJK	T. Ganesan	891	0.46%	
NTK	S. Rajkumar	876	0.45%	
BSP	M. Shanmugam	529	0.27%	−0.55%
Independent	Senur Pon. Jayaraman	441	0.23%	
Independent	C. Rajamanikkam	414	0.21%	
Independent	M. Vinoth	292	0.15%	
Margin of victory		11,470	5.88%	2.27%
Turnout		194,988	74.11%	−2.89%
Registered electors		263,119		
AIADMK gain from CPI		Swing	-0.51%	

=== 2011 ===
2011 Tamil Nadu Legislative Assembly election: Gudiyatham
Party	Candidate	Votes	%	±%
CPI	K. Lingamuthu	79,416	49.07%	
DMK	K. Rajamarthandan	73,574	45.46%	
IJK	C. Bharathi	1,687	1.04%	
Independent	P. Vadivelan	1,416	0.87%	
BSP	E. Karunanithi	1,335	0.82%	0.03%
Puratchi Bharatham	P. Maganathan	1,168	0.72%	
Independent	A. Mathi	1,053	0.65%	
Independent	C. Baskaran	595	0.37%	
Independent	A. Ramesh Babu	558	0.34%	
Independent	E. Kanagaraj	499	0.31%	
LJP	C. Rajan	297	0.18%	
Margin of victory		5,842	3.61%	2.25%
Turnout		210,194	76.99%	8.83%
Registered electors		161,833		
CPI gain from CPI(M)		Swing	9.38%	

=== 2006 ===
2006 Tamil Nadu Legislative Assembly election: Gudiyatham
Party	Candidate	Votes	%	±%
CPI(M)	G. Latha	48,166	39.70%	
AIADMK	J. K. N. Palani	46,516	38.34%	−18.71%
DMDK	L. K. Sudhish	20,557	16.94%	
Independent	S. Natarajan	1,500	1.24%	
SP	P. V. Govindaraji	1,073	0.88%	
BJP	K. S. Kumaravelu	997	0.82%	
BSP	E. Karunanidhi	965	0.80%	
Independent	M. Govindasamy	768	0.63%	
Independent	V. P. Sankaran	453	0.37%	
Independent	V. Tamilselvan	343	0.28%	
Margin of victory		1,650	1.36%	−21.34%
Turnout		121,338	68.16%	3.17%
Registered electors		178,024		
CPI(M) gain from AIADMK		Swing	-17.35%	

=== 2001 ===
2001 Tamil Nadu Legislative Assembly election: Gudiyatham
Party	Candidate	Votes	%	±%
AIADMK	C. M. Suryakala	61,128	57.05%	
DMK	S. Duraisamy	36,804	34.35%	−14.27%
MDMK	N. Panneer	4,197	3.92%	−4.08%
JD(S)	S. M. Devaraji	2,135	1.99%	
Independent	M. Lakshmikanthan	2,046	1.91%	
LJP	S. Anbuselvakumar	842	0.79%	
Margin of victory		24,324	22.70%	−6.30%
Turnout		107,152	64.99%	−1.78%
Registered electors		164,937		
AIADMK gain from DMK		Swing	8.43%	

=== 1996 ===
1996 Tamil Nadu Legislative Assembly election: Gudiyatham
Party	Candidate	Votes	%	±%
DMK	V. G. Dhanapal	48,837	48.62%	
INC	S. Ramgopal	19,701	19.61%	−44.79%
Independent	R. Venugopal	13,713	13.65%	
MDMK	N. Panneer	8,037	8.00%	
MGRM	G. Viswanathan	7,099	7.07%	
Independent	D. Eswaran	1,363	1.36%	
Independent	N. Krishnan	357	0.36%	
Independent	S. Gouse Basha	354	0.35%	
Independent	C. Sundaram	214	0.21%	
Independent	L. Gangadharan	202	0.20%	
Independent	A. Muralirajan	154	0.15%	
Margin of victory		29,136	29.00%	−6.23%
Turnout		100,453	66.77%	1.90%
Registered electors		160,659		
DMK gain from INC		Swing	-15.79%	

=== 1991 ===
1991 Tamil Nadu Legislative Assembly election: Gudiyatham
Party	Candidate	Votes	%	±%
INC	V. Dhandayuthapani	63,796	64.41%	49.13%
CPI(M)	R. Paramasivam	28,897	29.17%	5.72%
PMK	S. R. Rajavel	3,323	3.35%	
BJP	D. G. Prabakaran	2,390	2.41%	
THMM	D. Gunsekaran	268	0.27%	
Independent	D. Ramachandaran	210	0.21%	
Independent	C. Logu	169	0.17%	
Margin of victory		34,899	35.23%	33.02%
Turnout		99,053	64.87%	−7.11%
Registered electors		157,089		
INC gain from CPI(M)		Swing	40.95%	

=== 1989 ===
1989 Tamil Nadu Legislative Assembly election: Gudiyatham
Party	Candidate	Votes	%	±%
CPI(M)	K. R. Sundaram	22,037	23.46%	−2.09%
AIADMK	R. Venugopal	19,958	21.24%	
Independent	A. K. Sundararajulu	18,348	19.53%	
INC	R. Govindasamy	14,353	15.28%	−23.87%
Independent	K. Jayapal	7,140	7.60%	
Independent	D. Jayanthilal	5,247	5.59%	
Independent	K. Yuvaraj	3,860	4.11%	
Independent	K. Kumarasamy	996	1.06%	
Independent	M. Govindasamy	366	0.39%	
Independent	M. Ramamoorthy	311	0.33%	
Independent	C. Singaram	250	0.27%	
Margin of victory		2,079	2.21%	−5.66%
Turnout		93,943	71.98%	−4.37%
Registered electors		133,687		
CPI(M) gain from INC		Swing	-15.69%	

=== 1984 ===
1984 Tamil Nadu Legislative Assembly election: Gudiyatham
Party	Candidate	Votes	%	±%
INC	R. Govindasamy	32,077	39.15%	
Independent	A. K. Sundararajan	25,630	31.28%	
CPI(M)	K. R. Sundaram	20,930	25.55%	−18.32%
Independent	O. C. Subramaniyam	981	1.20%	
Independent	S. B. Akbar	743	0.91%	
Independent	P. S. Ganesan	495	0.60%	
Independent	M. V. Palani	300	0.37%	
Independent	B. S. Mohammed Jinna	289	0.35%	
Independent	S. Rangasamy	224	0.27%	
Independent	S. R. Duraisamy	136	0.17%	
Independent	D. Murugan Alias Durai Murugesan	123	0.15%	
Margin of victory		6,447	7.87%	−6.26%
Turnout		81,928	76.34%	12.06%
Registered electors		115,465		
INC gain from CPI(M)		Swing	-4.72%	

=== 1980 ===
1980 Tamil Nadu Legislative Assembly election: Gudiyatham
Party	Candidate	Votes	%	±%
CPI(M)	K. R. Sundaram	30,869	43.87%	14.33%
Independent	K. A. Wahab	20,929	29.74%	
JP	A. K. Sundra Rajulu	17,832	25.34%	
Independent	P. S. Ganesan	735	1.04%	
Margin of victory		9,940	14.13%	10.48%
Turnout		70,365	64.28%	−1.84%
Registered electors		110,942		
CPI(M) hold		Swing	14.33%	

=== 1977 ===
1977 Tamil Nadu Legislative Assembly election: Gudiyatham
Party	Candidate	Votes	%	±%
CPI(M)	V. K. Kothandaraman	20,590	29.54%	
JP	Soundararajulu Naidu	18,046	25.89%	
INC	R. Govindasamy	15,753	22.60%	−7.36%
DMK	K. G. Muniyappan	12,224	17.54%	−38.84%
Independent	K. Munasamy Choudary	1,564	2.24%	
Independent	D. Ranganathan	879	1.26%	
Independent	P. S. Ghanesan	636	0.91%	
Margin of victory		2,544	3.65%	−22.76%
Turnout		69,692	66.13%	−5.23%
Registered electors		106,905		
CPI(M) gain from DMK		Swing	-26.83%	

=== 1971 ===
1971 Tamil Nadu Legislative Assembly election: Gudiyatham
Party	Candidate	Votes	%	±%
DMK	E. K. Duraiswamy	34,954	56.38%	
INC	D. A. Adimoolam	18,580	29.97%	−4.56%
CPI(M)	V. K. Kothandaraman	5,721	9.23%	
Independent	R. Krishnan	2,745	4.43%	
Margin of victory		16,374	26.41%	−0.27%
Turnout		62,000	71.36%	−7.24%
Registered electors		91,545		
DMK gain from CPI(M)		Swing	-4.83%	

=== 1967 ===
1967 Madras Legislative Assembly election: Gudiyatham
Party	Candidate	Votes	%	±%
CPI(M)	V. K. Kothandaraman	38,825	61.21%	
INC	B. R. Naidu	21,901	34.53%	−10.44%
CPI	G. Kannabiran	2,708	4.27%	
Margin of victory		16,924	26.68%	8.31%
Turnout		63,434	78.60%	15.65%
Registered electors		85,177		
CPI(M) gain from INC		Swing	16.23%	

=== 1962 ===
1962 Madras Legislative Assembly election: Gudiyatham
Party	Candidate	Votes	%	±%
INC	T. Manavalan	25,795	44.97%	23.50%
RPI	C. Kuppuswamy	15,258	26.60%	
CPI	Munuswamy	13,801	24.06%	
Independent	B. Perumal	2,506	4.37%	
Margin of victory		10,537	18.37%	18.07%
Turnout		57,360	62.96%	−27.75%
Registered electors		95,434		
INC gain from CPI		Swing	23.19%	

=== 1957 ===
1957 Madras Legislative Assembly election: Gudiyatham
Party	Candidate	Votes	%	±%
CPI	V. K. Kothandaraman	33,811	21.78%	
INC	T. Manavalan	33,341	21.47%	1.34%
Independent	M. Krishnasami (Sc)	29,310	18.88%	
Independent	Samasivan	15,593	10.04%	
Independent	Pulavar A. Mani Ezhilan (Sc)	10,751	6.92%	
Margin of victory		470	0.30%	−4.01%
Turnout		155,268	90.71%	−4.81%
Registered electors		171,171		
CPI gain from INC		Swing	1.65%	

=== 1952 ===
1952 Madras Legislative Assembly election: Gudiyatham
Party	Candidate	Votes	%	±%
INC	A. J. Arunachala Mudaliar	24,101	20.13%	20.13%
Independent	P. S. Rajagopala Naidu	18,940	15.82%	
CPI	Dr. Kannabiran	14,817	12.38%	
Justice Party	G. M. Annalthango	11,829	9.88%	
RPI	Dhanapal	10,405	8.69%	
Independent	K. Palani	6,655	5.56%	
Independent	J. J. Dass	5,861	4.90%	
Socialist Party (India)	A. A. Govindaraja Mudaliar	5,023	4.20%	
Independent	Perkodian	4,284	3.58%	
Margin of victory		5,161	4.31%	
Turnout		119,732	95.52%	
Registered electors		125,352		
INC win (new seat)				
