= M. M. Vinoth Kannan =

Indian politician (born 1989)

M. Murali Vinoth Kannan (born 1989) is an Indian politician from Tamil Nadu. He is a member of the Tamil Nadu Legislative Assembly from Vellore Assembly constituency in Vellore district representing Tamilaga Vettri Kazhagam.

== Early life ==
Kannan is from Vellore, Tamil Nadu. He is the son of S. Murali. He did his schooling at Jyothi High School, Gudiyatham and passed Class 10 in March 2005. He runs his own business as Proprietor of Alama Tamil Nadu and Sri Group of Companies. He declared assets worth Rs.2 crore in his affidavit to the Election Commission of India.

== Career ==
Kannan became and MLA for the first time winning the 2026 Tamil Nadu Legislative Assembly election from Vellore Assembly constituency representing Tamilaga Vettri Kazhagam. He polled 73,032 votes and defeated his nearest rival and sitting MLA, P. Karthikeyan of the Dravida Munnetra Kazhagam, by a margin of 6,777 votes.
