= Gandhi Memorial Mandapam, Kanyakumari =

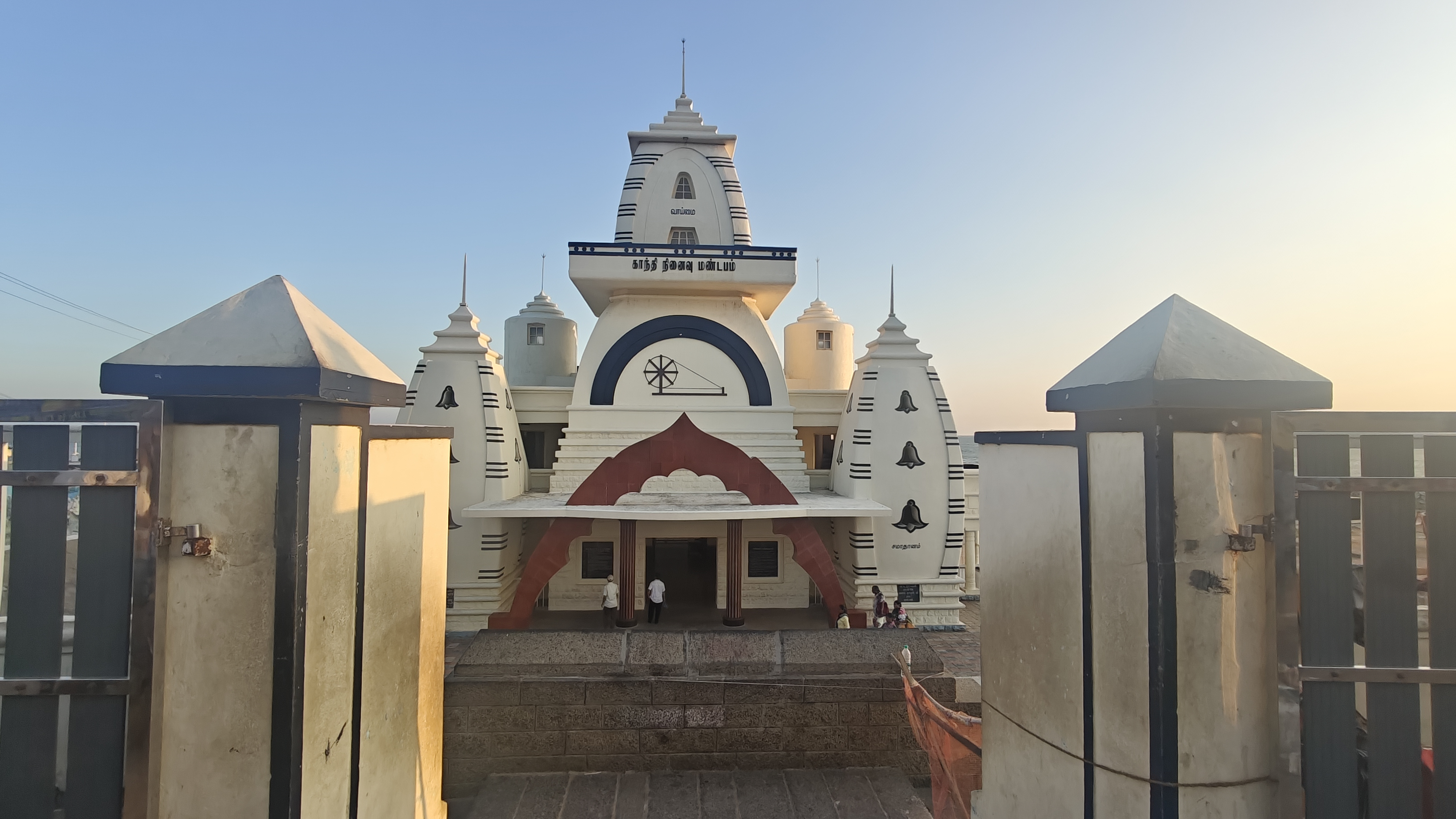
The entrance

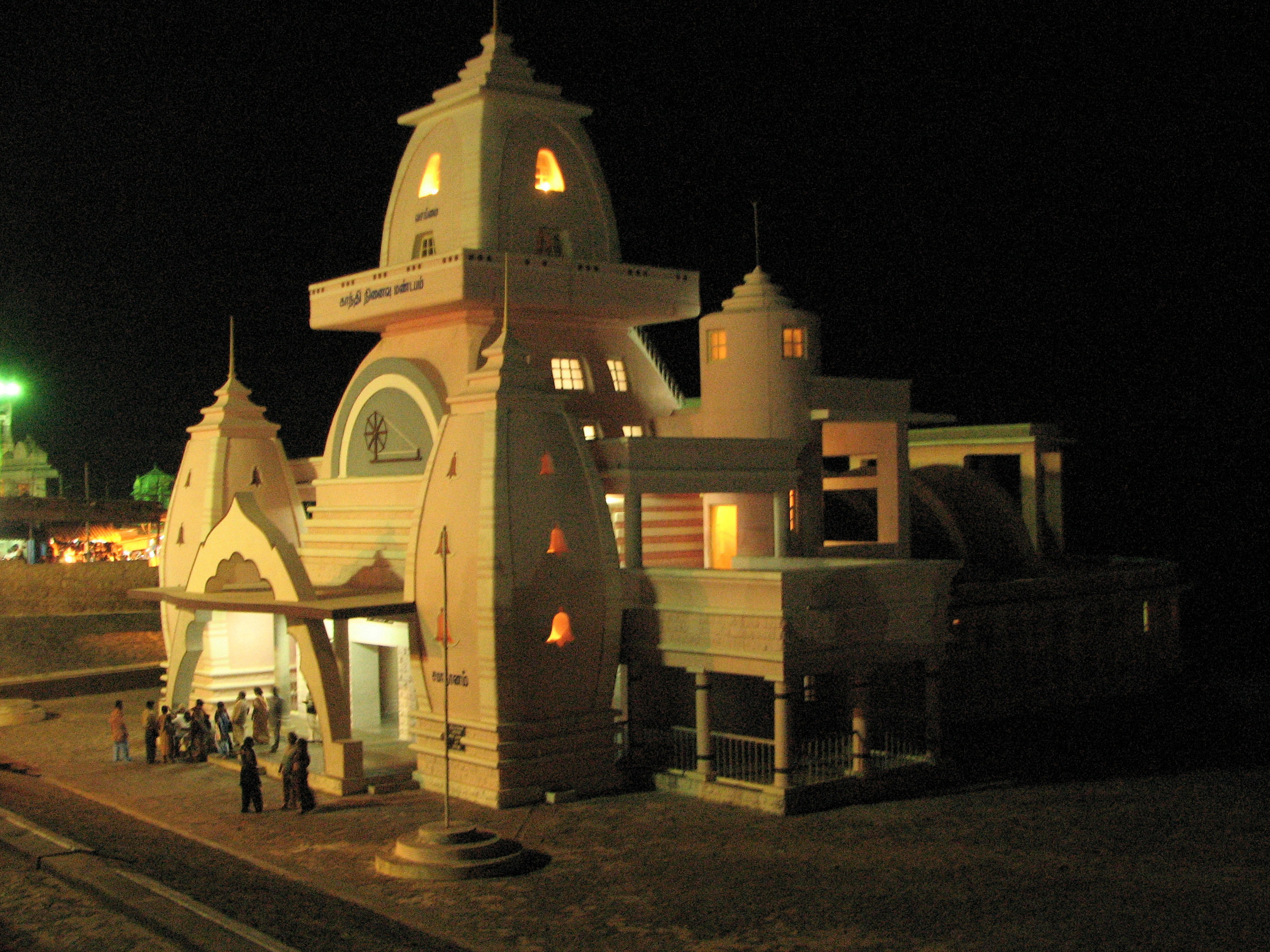
Mandapa in night

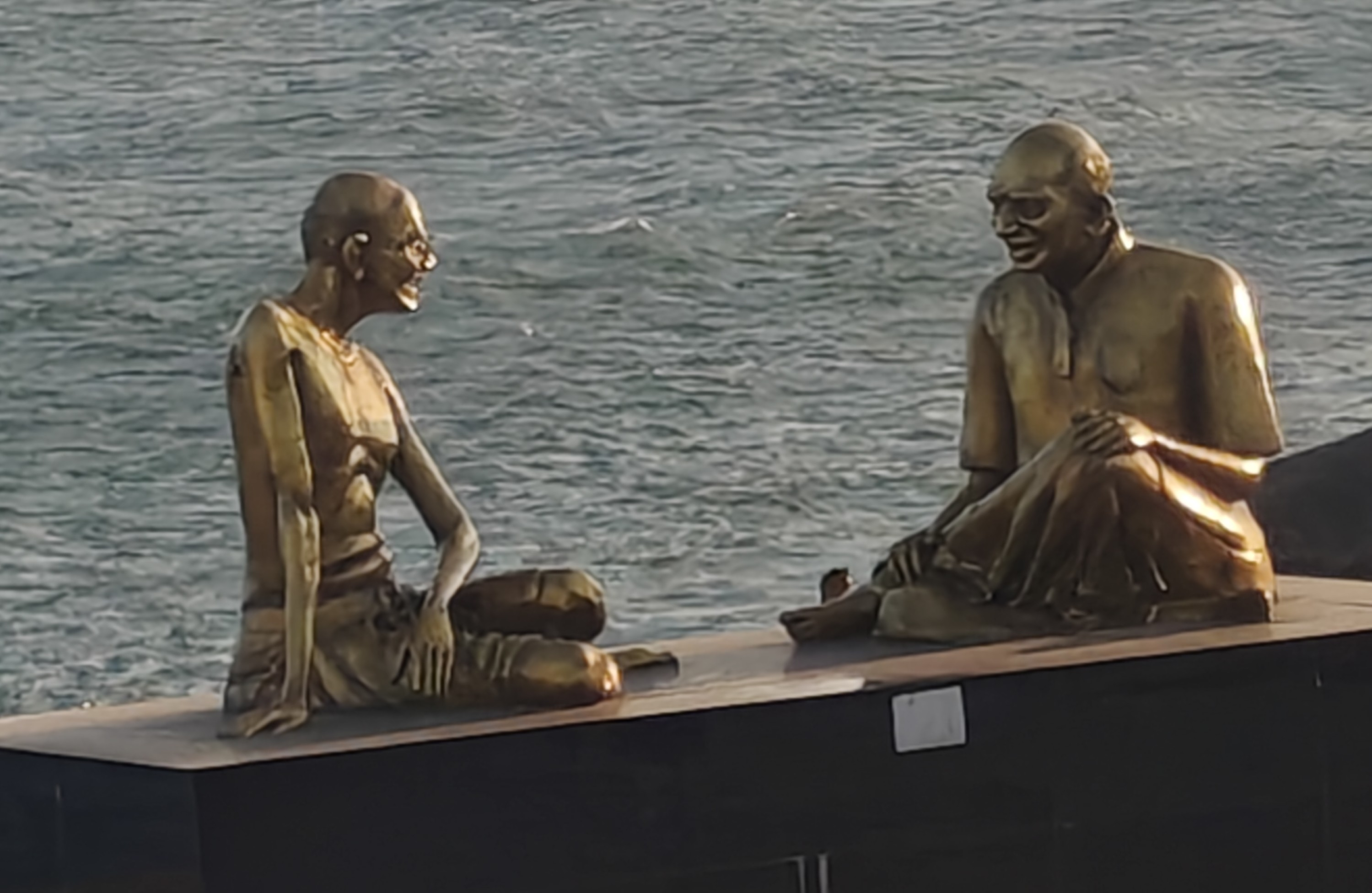
Statues of Gandhi and Kamaraj in the beach

Gandhi Memorial Mandapam is a memorial, situated at Kanyakumari, Tamil Nadu, India. In this place the ashes of Mahatma Gandhi were kept before immersion.

== The urn ==
Gandhi came to Kanyakumari twice in 1925 and 1937. After his death, in 1948, his ashes were placed in 12 urns and were sent for immersion to different places in India. The place in which the urn was kept in Kanyakumari, this mandapa was built.

== Speciality ==
The architecture of this mandapa is of Odisha. This mandapa was built in 1956. The main dome of this mandapa is of 79 meters high, denoting his age at the time of his death. Every year, on 2nd October, the birthday of Gandhi, the sun's rays would fall on the place where the urn was kept.

== Visiting hours ==
Public can visit this mandapa from 9.00 am to 7.00 p.m. The entry is free. Near to this Kamaraj memorial is found. Midst of the two memorials the statues of Gandhi and Kamaraj, in sitting pose, are found.
