= Kamarajar Manimandapam, Kanyakumari =

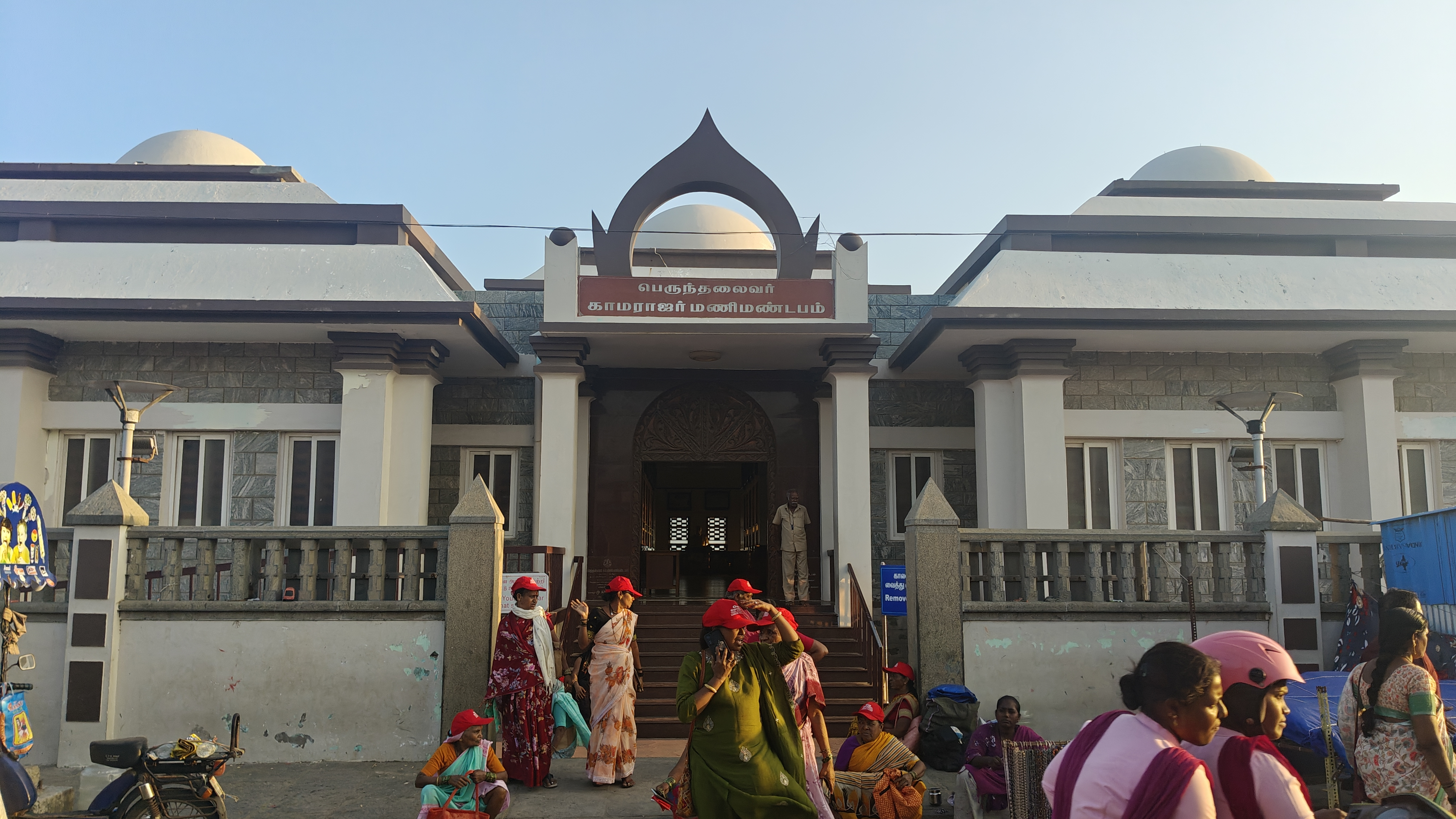
Kamarajar Manimandapam

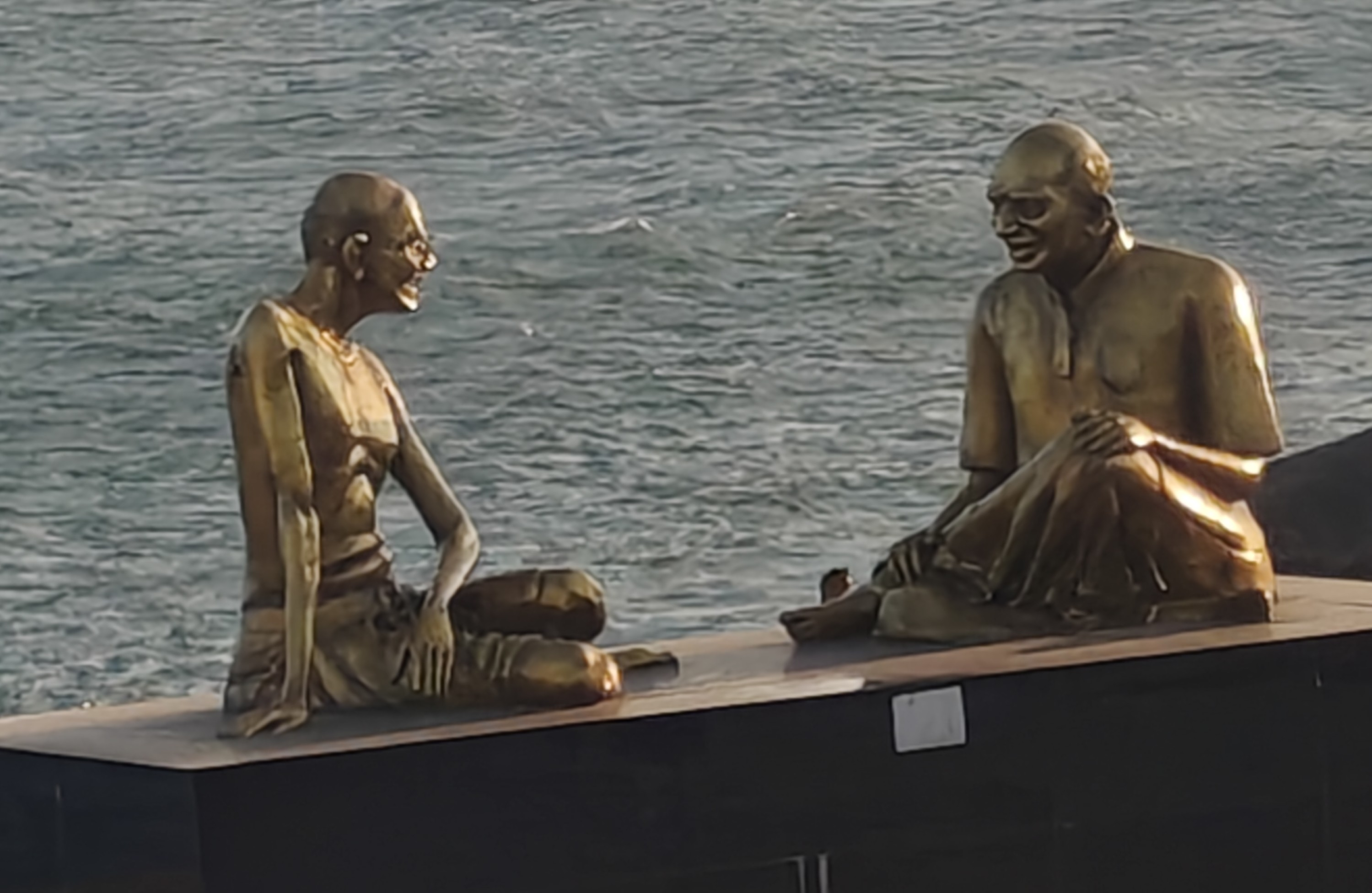
Statues of Gandhi and Kamaraj in the beach

Kamarajar Manimandapam is a memorial, situated at Kanyakumari, Tamil Nadu, India. In this place the ashes of K. Kamaraj were kept before immersion.

== The ashes ==
After his death, his ashes were kept at Kanyakumari for paying respects to the leader. On that place this memorial mandapam was built. This structure was opened on 2nd October 2000.

== Photogallery and Library ==
In this mandapa rare photographs connected with the life of Kamaraj is exhibited. A library is also functioning here.

== Visiting hours ==
Public can visit this mandapa from 7.00 am to 7.30 p.m. The entry is free. Near to this Gandhi memorial is found. Midst of the two memorials the statues of Gandhi and Kamaraj, in sitting pose, are found.
