= V. G. Dhanapal =

Indian politician

V. G. Dhanapal was elected to the Tamil Nadu Legislative Assembly from the Gudiyatham constituency in the 1996 elections. He was a candidate of the Dravida Munnetra Kazhagam (DMK) party.
