= T. Manavalan =

Indian politician

T. Manavalan was an Indian politician and former Member of the Legislative Assembly of Tamil Nadu. He was elected to the Tamil Nadu legislative assembly from Gudiyatham constituency as an Indian National Congress candidate in 1957, and 1962 elections.
