= V. Amulu =

Indian politician

Member of the Tamil Nadu Legislative Assembly
- In office 12 May 2021 – 4 May 2026
- Constituency: Gudiyatham

Personal details
- Party: Dravida Munnetra Kazhagam

V. Amulu is an Indian politician who is a Member of Legislative Assembly of Tamil Nadu. She was elected from Gudiyatham as a Dravida Munnetra Kazhagam candidate in 2021.

== Electoral performance ==
2021 Tamil Nadu Legislative Assembly election: Gudiyatham
| Party | Candidate | Votes | % | ±% |
|---|---|---|---|---|
| DMK | V. Amulu | 100,412 | 47.83% | ▼4.22 |
| AIADMK | G. Paritha | 93,511 | 44.54% | ▲6.14 |
| NTK | R. Kalaiyenthiri | 11,834 | 5.64% | 5.19% |
| AMMK | C. Jayanthi Padmanabhan | 1,822 | 0.87% | |
| NOTA | Nota | 1,699 | 0.81% | −0.34% |
| BSP | S. Raja | 505 | 0.24% | −0.03% |
| IJK | C. Rajan | 482 | 0.23% | |
| Independent | K. Jaikarthikeyan | 449 | 0.21% | |
| Independent | N. Lakshmipathy | 257 | 0.12% | |
| Independent | M. Elumalai | 168 | 0.08% | |
| Independent | P. Gunaseelan | 138 | 0.07% | |
| Margin of victory | | 6,901 | 3.29% | −2.60% |
| Turnout | | 209,931 | 72.47% | −1.64% |
| Rejected ballots | | 331 | 0.16% | |
| Registered electors | | 289,677 | | |
| DMK hold | | Swing | -0.73% | |
