= K. Sindhu =

Indian politician (born 1989)

Member of the Tamil Nadu Legislative Assembly
- Incumbent
- Assumed office 2026
- Constituency: Gudiyatham

Personal details
- Party: Tamilaga Vettri Kazhagam

K. Sindhu (born 1989) is an Indian politician from Tamil Nadu. She is a Member of the Legislative Assembly from Gudiyatham Assembly constituency which is reserved for Scheduled Caste community in Vellore district representing the Tamilaga Vettri Kazhagam.

Sindhu is from Vellore, Tamil Nadu. She is a postgraduate and runs Sindhi Music and Dance Academy.

Sindhu became an MLA winning the 2026 Tamil Nadu Legislative Assembly election from Gudiyatham Assembly constituency representing the Tamilaga Vettri Kazhagam. She polled 82,858 votes and defeated her nearest rival, K. B. Pradap of the Desiya Murpokku Dravida Kazhagam, by a margin of 10,097 votes.

== Electoral performance ==
Election	Constituency	Political party	Result	Vote %	Opposition			Ref
Election	Constituency	Political party	Result	Vote %	Candidate	Political party	Vote %	Ref
2026	Gudiyatham	TVK	Won	36.17%	K. B. Pradap	DMDK	31.76%	-
