= E. K. Duraiswamy =

Indian politician

- E. K. Duraiswamy, former MLA of Gudiyatham

Member of the Tamil Nadu Legislative Assembly
- In office 1971–1976
- Constituency: Gudiyatham

Personal details
- Party: Dravida Munnetra Kazhagam

E. K. Duraiswamy was an Indian politician associated with the Dravida Munnetra Kazhagam (DMK) who represented the Gudiyatham constituency in the Tamil Nadu Legislative Assembly. He was also a former Municipal Councillor of Gudiyatham.

Duraiswamy joined the DMK during the early years of the party's political growth and was influenced by the ideas and political movement of C. N. Annadurai, popularly known as Anna. He subsequently became active in the party's organisation in the Gudiyatham region.

He was elected to the Tamil Nadu Legislative Assembly from Gudiyatham in the 1971 Tamil Nadu Legislative Assembly election, becoming the first DMK candidate to win the constituency.

In the 1971 election, Duraiswamy received 34,954 votes, securing 56.38% of the votes polled. He defeated D. A. Adimoolam, who received 18,580 votes. Duraiswamy's winning margin was 16,374 votes.

== Political career ==
Duraiswamy was active in the DMK's political organisation in the Gudiyatham region during the 1960s and 1970s. He joined the DMK during its formative period and was influenced by the political ideas and movement led by C. N. Annadurai (Anna).

Before entering the Tamil Nadu Legislative Assembly, Duraiswamy served as a Municipal Councillor in Gudiyatham. In this role, he was involved in local civic affairs and public issues concerning the town and surrounding areas.

Duraiswamy subsequently became an important political figure in the Gudiyatham region and was active in raising issues concerning local development, irrigation, agriculture and water resources.

He was known for his public speaking and was regarded locally as one of the prominent speakers associated with the DMK in the former North Arcot district. His speeches contributed to the growth of the party's political organisation in the region.

Duraiswamy was elected to the Tamil Nadu Legislative Assembly from Gudiyatham in the 1971 Tamil Nadu Legislative Assembly election. His victory made him the first DMK MLA from the Gudiyatham constituency. He served as a member of the 5th Tamil Nadu Legislative Assembly (1971–1976).

=== Association with Periyar ===
Duraiswamy was associated with the social and political movements that shaped Tamil Nadu politics during the period. Periyar E. V. Ramasamy is reported to have visited Duraiswamy's residence during his visits to Gudiyatham.

The visit is remembered locally as part of Duraiswamy's association with prominent leaders of the Dravidian movement.

=== Public speaking ===
Duraiswamy was known for his public speaking and was regarded by supporters and contemporaries as a prominent speaker in the North Arcot region.

His speeches dealt with the political ideas of the DMK, social issues and matters concerning the development of Gudiyatham and surrounding areas.

== Mordhana Dam ==
Duraiswamy was among the local political leaders associated with the long-standing demand for the construction of the Mordhana Dam in the Gudiyatham region.

The demand for the project had been pursued by local political leaders for several years. According to a report published by The Hindu, Duraimurugan recalled that he laid the foundation stone for the Mordhana Dam in December 1990, when he was serving as Minister for Public Works and Forests. In the same account, Duraimurugan acknowledged the earlier efforts of local leaders, including E. K. Duraiswamy, who had persistently pursued the demand for the project during the 1960s and 1970s.

The Government of Tamil Nadu's Gudiyatham Municipality records state that the Mordhana Dam project was sanctioned in May 1990 and construction commenced in October 1990. The project was subsequently completed and became an important irrigation project for the region.

The acknowledgement by Duraimurugan provides a later account of the role played by early local political leaders, including Duraiswamy, in pursuing the project before its construction.

== Arrest during the Emergency ==
During the Indian Emergency (1975–1977), Duraiswamy was arrested and detained under the Maintenance of Internal Security Act (MISA).

His detention took place in the context of the political arrests carried out during the Emergency, when political leaders, activists and members of opposition parties were detained under preventive-detention provisions.

Duraiswamy's detention under MISA forms part of his political history and his association with the DMK during the Emergency period.

Further archival documentation is required to establish the exact date of his arrest, place of detention, duration of detention and other details concerning his MISA detention.

== Electoral performance ==
Election	Constituency	Political party	Result	Vote %	Opposition			Ref
Election	Constituency	Political party	Result	Vote %	Candidate	Political party	Vote %	Ref
1971	Gudiyatham	DMK	Won	56.38%	D. A. Adimoolam	Indian National Congress	29.97%	

== See also ==
- Dravida Munnetra Kazhagam
- C. N. Annadurai
- Periyar E. V. Ramasamy
- Tamil Nadu Legislative Assembly
- Gudiyatham
- Mordhana Dam
- The Emergency (India)
- Maintenance of Internal Security Act
