= Gandhi Mandapam (Chennai) =

Memorial structures built on Sardar Patel Salai, in Adyar, Chennai

Coordinates: 13°0′24″N 80°14′14″E

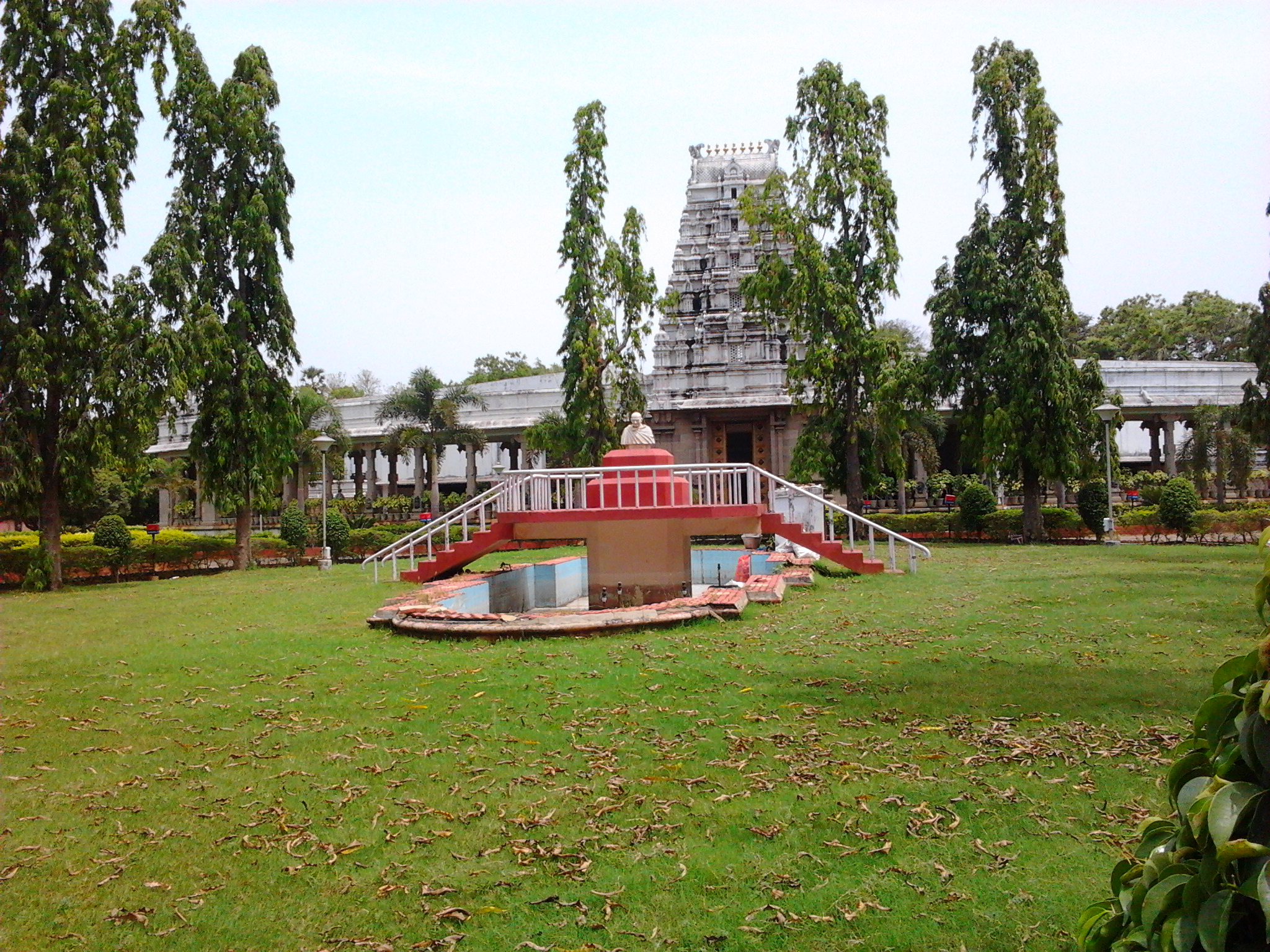
Gandhi Mandapam

Gandhi Mandapam is a series of memorial structures built on Sardar Patel Salai, in Adyar, Chennai. The first structure to be built on the premises was a memorial to Mahatma Gandhi, opened by then Chief Minister of Madras, C. Rajagopalachari on 27 January 1956. Later, four other memorials for independence activist Rettamalai Srinivasan and former chief ministers C. Rajagopalachari, K. Kamaraj and M. Bhakthavatsalam were added.

Owing to its prominence, the premises are often utilized for public functions, particularly for cultural discourses and music shows. The site also serves as a recreational park in the city.

It is located nearby Anna University and IIT Madras.

== See also ==
- Architecture of Chennai
- Heritage structures in Chennai
