= Rettamalai Srinivasan =

Indian scheduled caste activist and politician (1860-1945)

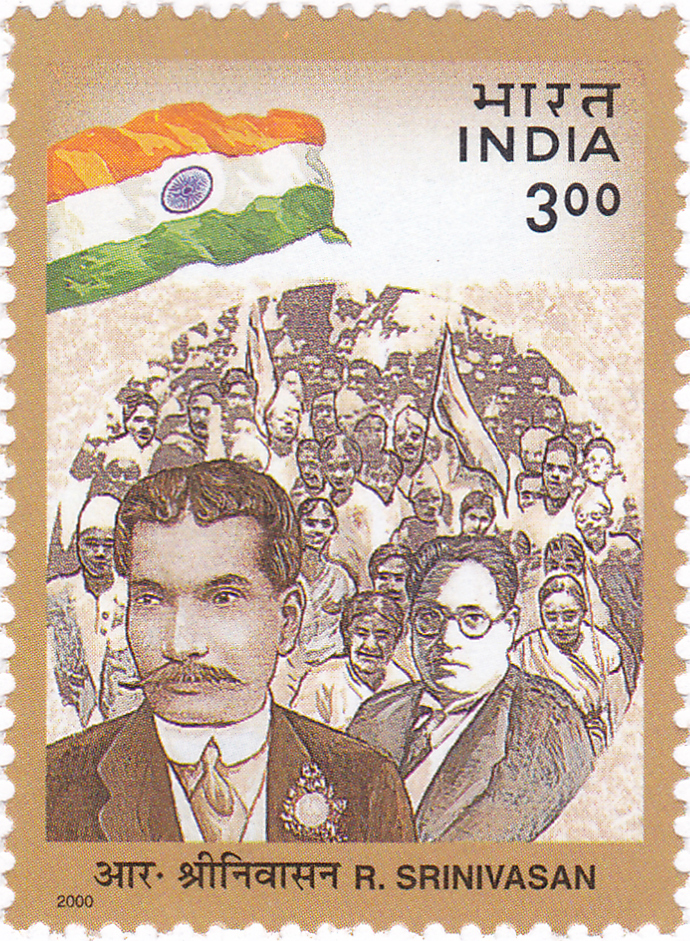
- Srinivasan (left) and Ambedkar (right) on a 2000 stamp of India
- Born: 7 July 1860; Madras Presidency, British India
- Died: 18 September 1945 (aged 86); Madras Presidency, British India
- Occupations: Lawyer, Journalist and Politician

Diwan Bahadur Rettamalai Srinivasan (7 July 1860 – 18 September 1945), commonly known as R. Srinivasan, was a scheduled caste activist and politician from then Madras Presidency of British India (now the Indian state of Tamil Nadu). He is a Paraiyar icon and was a close associate of Mahatma Gandhi and was also an associate of B. R. Ambedkar. He is remembered today as one of the pioneers of the Scheduled caste movement in India. He founded the Adi dravida mahajana sabha in 1893.

== Early life ==
Rettamalai Srinivasan was born on 7 July 1860 (or 1859) in a poor Tamil family in Madras Presidency. His family was able to send him to a residential school in Coimbatore because of his father Rettamalai's trade relations with the British. He was the only Paraiyar student among the 400 pupils in the school. He then worked as an accountant at Ooty which was then the summer capital of the Madras presidency. Ooty was brimming with Dalit political activism then and Srinivasan grew interested.

He was a brother-in-law of the famous scheduled castes activist Iyothee Thass. He worked as a translator in a South African court when Gandhi was practicing there as an advocate; he was instrumental in Mahathma Gandhi putting his signature in Tamil as "Mo.Ka. Gandhi" (Mohandas Karamchand Gandhi in Tamil).

Srinivasan established and led the Paraiyar Mahajana Sabha in 1891 which later became the Adi-Dravida Mahajana Sabha. He founded a Tamil newspaper called Paraiyan in October 1893 which started selling as a monthly with four pages for the price of four annas. However, Paraiyan experienced great difficulties in its early days.

Srinivasan was a participant in the freedom movement and an arrest warrant was issued against him claiming that he was fleeing the nation. In 1896, a case was filed against the newspaper and Srinivasan was dragged to the court citing a letter to the editor. The editor Srinivasan was fined ₹ 100 for his writings.

Front page of the Tamil magazine Paraiyan launched by Rettamalai Srinivasan in 1893

== Round Table Conference ==
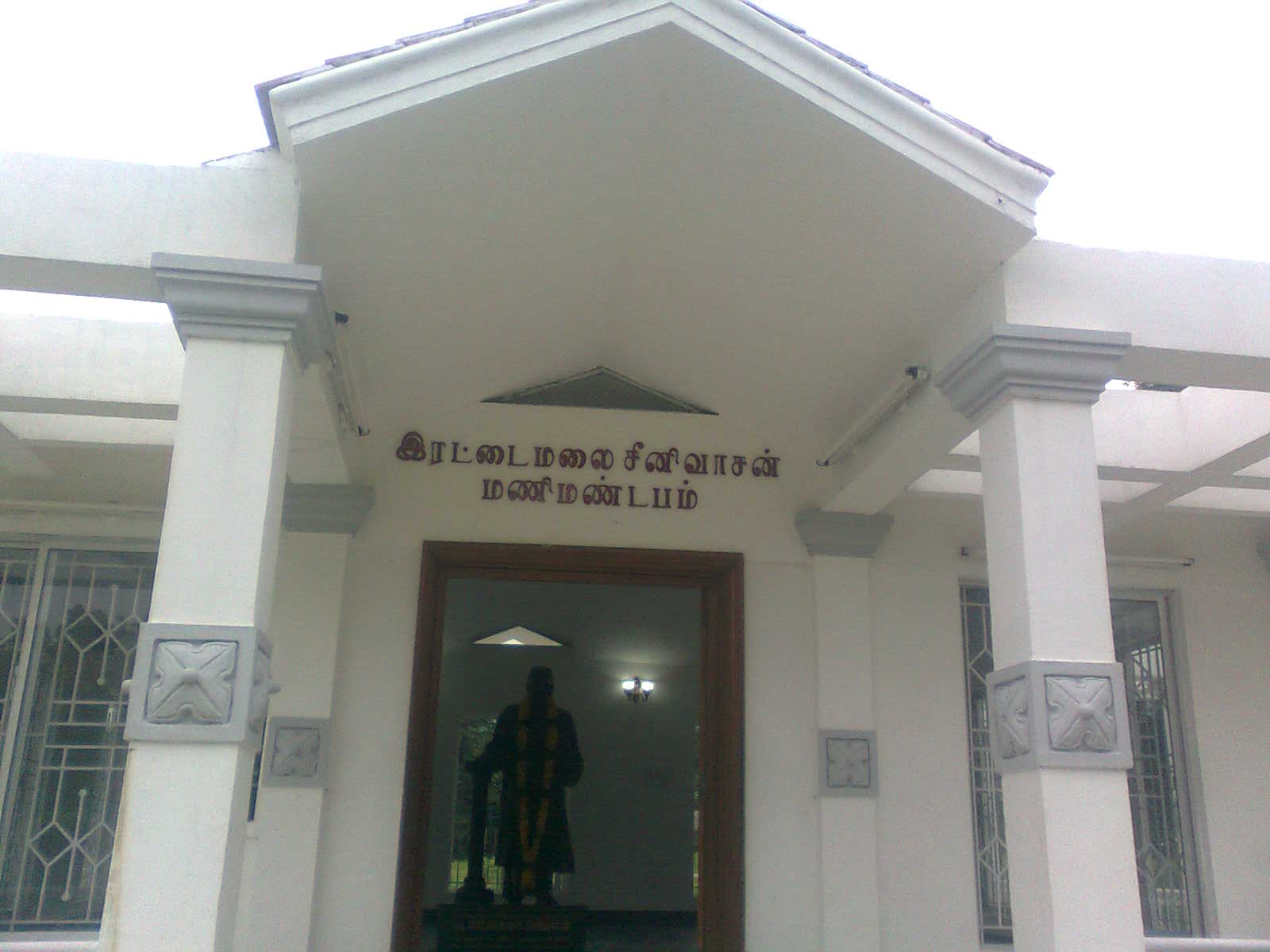
Rettamalai Srinivasan memorial building, Gandhi Mandapam, Chennai.

Rettamalai Srinivasan represented the Paraiyars in the first two Round Table Conferences in London (1930 and 1931) along with B. R. Ambedkar. In 1932, Ambedkar, M. C. Rajah and Rettamalai Srinivasan briefly joined the board of the Servants of Untouchables Society established by Gandhi. In 1936, he established the Madras Province Scheduled Castes' Party.

In the Round Table Conference, he shared the dais with Ambedkar and continued to have interaction with him. But, he differed greatly with Ambedkar on the question of untouchables converting to other religions. In the Yeola Conference in 1935, Ambedkar thundered "I was born as a Hindu, I solemnly assure you that I will not die as a Hindu". Rettamalai Srinivasan said, "Depressed Classes are not in the Hindu fold. They are full blooded Dravidian in race".

In 1936 he was conferred to the title of 'Diwan Bahadur' by British government for his service to Depressed Classes.

== Memorials ==
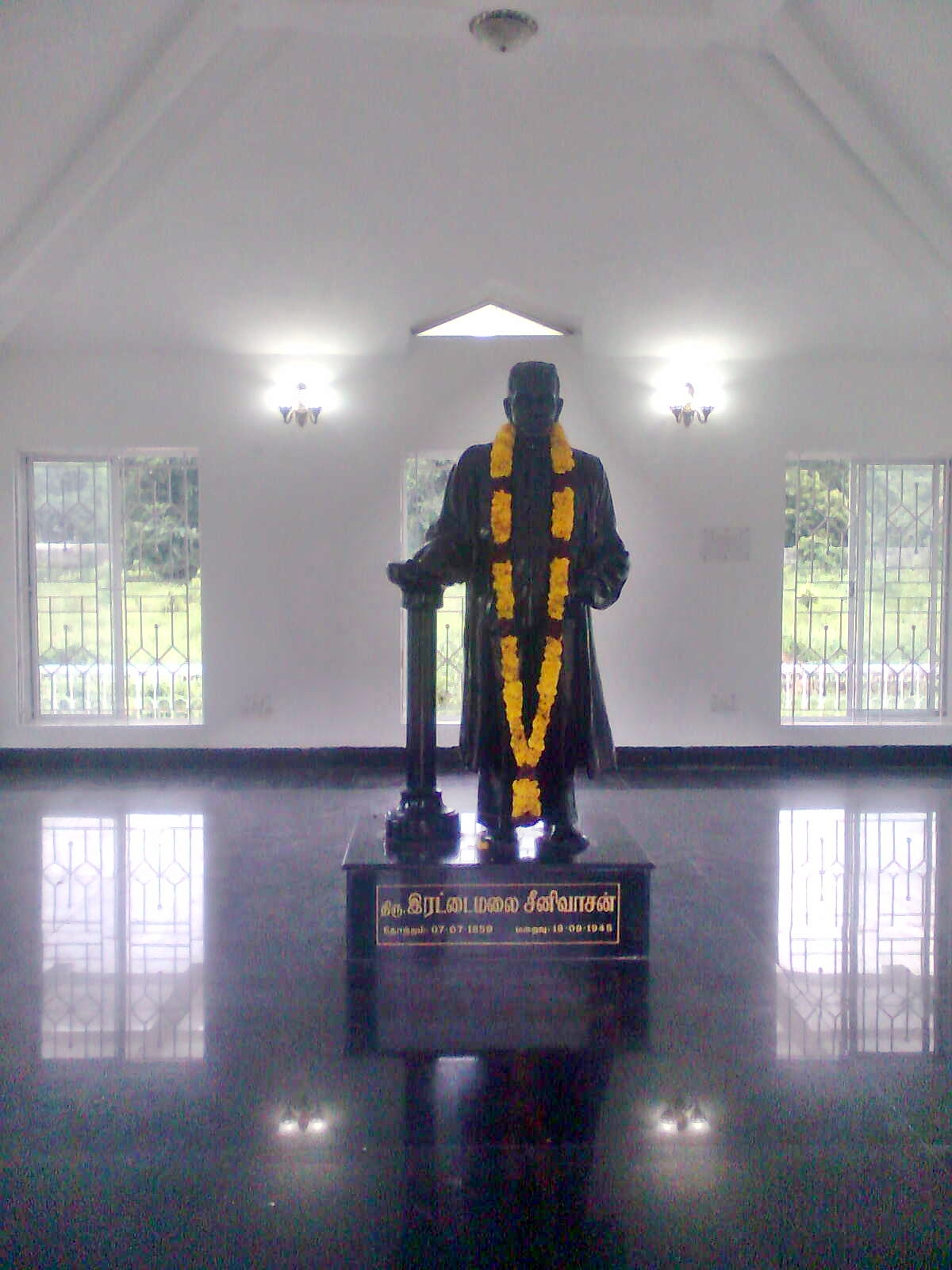
Statue of Rettamalai Srinivasan, Gandhi Mandapam, Chennai

Commemorative stamps have been issued in memory of Rettamalai Srinivasan by the Department of Posts of the Government of India. Cadres of the Viduthalai Siruthaigal party claimed to have discovered the remains of the Paraiyar leader in Otteri and constructed a memorial over his mortal remains and named it Urimai Kalam. On 6 July 2011, Chief Minister J Jayalalithaa had directed that his birth anniversary on 7 July be observed as a government function and ministers to honour him by garlanding his statue located inside Gandhi Mandapam, Chennai.

His grandson B. Parameswaran became a minister in the Government of Tamil Nadu and a member of the Indian parliament.
