= C. Jayanthi Padmanabhan =

Indian politician

Member of the Tamil Nadu Legislative Assembly
- In office 2016–2021
- Constituency: Gudiyatham

Personal details
- Party: All India Anna Dravida Munnetra Kazhagam

C. Jayanthi Padmanabhan was an Indian politician and former Member of the Legislative Assembly of Tamil Nadu. She was elected to the Tamil Nadu legislative assembly as an All India Anna Dravida Munnetra Kazhagam candidate from Gudiyatham constituency in the 2016.

She was one of the 18 members who were disqualified by Speaker P. Dhanapal as they withdrew support to Chief Minister Edappadi K. Palaniswami and became loyal to rebel leader T.T.V. Dhinakaran and joined his party Amma Makkal Munnetra Kazhagam.

She was betrayed by TTV and she went to DMK now.

== Electoral performance ==
Election	Constituency	Political party	Result	Vote %	Opposition			Ref
Election	Constituency	Political party	Result	Vote %	Candidate	Political party	Vote %	Ref
2016	Gudiyatham	AIADMK	Won	48.56%	K. Rajamarthandan	DMK	42.68%	
2019 by-election	Gudiyatham	Independent	Lost	4.09%	S. Kathavarayan	DMK	53.06%	
2021	Gudiyatham	AMMK	Lost	0.87%	V. Amulu	DMK	47.83%	-
