= K. R. Sundaram =

Indian politician

Member of the Tamil Nadu Legislative Assembly
- In office 1989–1994
- Constituency: Gudiyatham
- In office 1980–1985

Personal details
- Party: Communist Party of India (Marxist)

K. R. Sundaram is an Indian politician and former Member of the Legislative Assembly of Tamil Nadu. He was elected to the Tamil Nadu legislative assembly from Gudiyatham constituency as a Communist Party of India (Marxist) candidate in the 1980 and 1989 elections.

== Electoral performance ==
Election	Constituency	Political party	Result	Vote %	Opposition			Ref
Election	Constituency	Political party	Result	Vote %	Candidate	Political party	Vote %	Ref
1952	Vellore	CPI	Lost	10.68%	A. K. Masilamani Chetty	INC	16.76%	
1980	Gudiyatham	CPI(M)	Won	43.87%	K. A. Wahab	Independent	29.74%	
1984	Gudiyatham	CPI(M)	Lost	25.55%	R. Govindasamy	INC	39.15%	
1989	Gudiyatham	CPI(M)	Won	23.46%	R. Venugopal	AIADMK	21.24%	
