= G. Latha =

Indian politician

Member of the Tamil Nadu Legislative Assembly
- In office 2006–2011
- Constituency: Gudiyatham

Personal details
- Party: Communist Party of India (Marxist)

G. Latha was elected to the Tamil Nadu Legislative Assembly from the Gudiyatham constituency in the 2006 election. He was a candidate of the Communist Party of India (Marxist) (CPM) party.

== Electoral performance ==
Election	Constituency	Political party	Result	Vote %	Opposition			Ref
Election	Constituency	Political party	Result	Vote %	Candidate	Political party	Vote %	Ref
2006	Gudiyatham	CPI(M)	Won	39.70%	J. K. N. Palani	AIADMK	38.34%	
