= C. M. Suryakala =

Member of the Legislative Assembly, Tamil Nadu Legislative Assembly
- In office 2001–2006
- Preceded by: V. Jayanthi
- Succeeded by: G. Karunanithi
- Constituency: Gudiyattam

Personal details
- Party: AIADMK
- Occupation: Politician

C. M. Suryakala is an Indian politician and a former member of the Tamil Nadu Legislative Assembly from the Gudiyatham Assembly constituency. She won the Gudiyattam seat representing the All India Anna Dravida Munnetra Kazhagam in the 2001 Tamil Nadu legislative assembly election.

== Electoral Performance ==
=== 2001 ===
2001 Tamil Nadu Legislative Assembly election: Gudiyatham
Party	Candidate	Votes	%	±%
AIADMK	C. M. Suryakala	61,128	57.05%	
DMK	S. Duraisamy	36,804	34.35%	−14.27%
MDMK	N. Panneer	4,197	3.92%	−4.08%
JD(S)	S. M. Devaraji	2,135	1.99%	
Independent	M. Lakshmikanthan	2,046	1.91%	
LJP	S. Anbuselvakumar	842	0.79%	
Margin of victory		24,324	22.70%	−6.30%
Turnout		107,152	64.99%	−1.78%
Registered electors		164,937		
AIADMK gain from DMK		Swing	8.43%	
