= V. M. Devaraj =

Indian politician

V. M. Devaraj is an Indian politician and former Member of the Legislative Assembly of Tamil Nadu. He was elected to the Tamil Nadu legislative assembly from Vellore constituency as a Dravida Munnetra Kazhagam candidate in 1980, 1984 and 1989 elections.
