= P. Karthikeyan =

Indian politician

Member of the Tamil Nadu Legislative Assembly
- In office 16 May 2016 – 4 May 2026
- Preceded by: Dr.V.S.Vijay
- Constituency: Vellore

Personal details
- Party: Dravida Munnetra Kazhagam

P. Karthikeyan is an Indian politician who is a Member of Legislative Assembly of Tamil Nadu. He was elected from Vellore as a Dravida Munnetra Kazhagam candidate in 2021.

== Electoral performance ==
2021 Tamil Nadu Legislative Assembly election: Vellore
Party	Candidate	Votes	%	±%
DMK	P. Karthikeyan	84,299	47.24%	−4.29
AIADMK	S. R. K. Appu	75,118	42.09%	+5.86
NTK	N. Poonkundran	8,530	4.78%	+3.82
MNM	G. Vikram Chakravarthy	7,243	4.06%	New
NOTA	NOTA	1,441	0.81%	−0.59
Tamil Nadu Ilangyar Katchi	R. Naresh Kumar	928	0.52%	New
Margin of victory		9,181	5.14%	−10.16%
Turnout		178,458	70.52%	1.93%
Rejected ballots		324	0.18%	
Registered electors		253,049		
DMK hold		Swing	-4.29%	

2016 Tamil Nadu Legislative Assembly election: Vellore
Party	Candidate	Votes	%	±%
DMK	P. Karthikeyan	88,264	51.53%	New
AIADMK	Harun Rasheed	62,054	36.23%	−14.59
BJP	S. Elangovan	5,212	3.04%	−0.04
PMK	D. Lakshmi Narayanan	5,185	3.03%	New
VCK	A. R. Abdur Rahman	2,590	1.51%	New
NOTA	NOTA	2,400	1.40%	New
NTK	A. Manigandan	1,639	0.96%	New
SDPI	Shaik Meeran	1,100	0.64%	New
Margin of victory		26,210	15.30%	4.52%
Turnout		171,279	68.59%	−5.00%
Registered electors		249,715		
DMK gain from AIADMK		Swing	0.71%	
