= MGRM =

MGRM or M.G.R.M. may refer to:

== Organisations ==
- The Malta LGBTIQ Rights Movement, the LGBT rights organisation in Malta, formerly known as Malta Gay Rights Movement (setup 2001)
- Monogram Technologies Inc, (formerly NASDAQ: MGRM) acquired by Zimmer Biomet in 2025
- Hitachi MGRM Net, Hitachi#Subsidiaries and joint ventures with MGRM Net Limited (founded 1998)
- Dr. M.G.R. Medical University, a government medical university situated in Chennai, Tamil Nadu, India (established 1987)

== Others ==
- M.G.R. Memorial, a memorial complex for former Tamil Nadu CM M. G. Ramachandran (M.G.R.) and J. Jayalalithaa (Amma) - groundbreaking 1987
- MGR Magan, a 2021 Tamil-language film
