= Paradarami =

- Village
- Interactive map of Paradarami
- Coordinates: 13°04′00″N 78°58′30″E
- Country: India
- State: Tamil Nadu
- District: Vellore District
- Taluk: Gudiyattam

Paradarami is a village in Gudiyattam taluk, Vellore district, Tamil Nadu, India. It is located approximately 1 km from the border with Andhra Pradesh and it is surrounded by about 50 villages. It lies in between Gudiyattam to Chittoor State High Way. Paradarami is famous for its 4-days Gangamma festival held annually in the month of June.
