= V. K. Kothandaraman =

Indian politician

V. K. Kothandaraman was an Indian politician, anti-colonial nationalist and a former Member of the Legislative Assembly of Tamil Nadu. He was elected to the Tamil Nadu legislative assembly from Gudiyatham constituency in 1957, 1967 and 1977 elections.

He was born on 20 May, 1912 in an orthodox Hindu family but later became a Communist. He was popular political leader and in a short frame of time, became the leader of the Communist Party in Tamil Nadu.
