= M. P. Sarathy =

Indian politician

Member of the Madras State Assembly
- In office 1957 - 1962; 1967 - 1972; 1971 - 1976
- Constituency: Vellore

Personal details
- Political party: Dravida Munnetra Kazhagam

M. P. Sarathy was an Indian politician and former Member of the Legislative Assembly of Tamil Nadu. He was elected to the Tamil Nadu legislative assembly from Vellore constituency as an Independent candidate in 1957 election and as a Dravida Munnetra Kazhagam candidate in 1967, and 1971 elections.
