= Erikuthi =

Village in Tamil Nadu, India

- Village
- Location within Tamil Nadu Location within India
- Coordinates: 12°56′00″N 78°43′05″E
- Country: India
- State: Tamil Nadu
- District: Vellore
- Taluk: Gudiyatham

Government
  - Type: Gram panchayat

Area
  - Total: 3.23 km^{2} (1.25 sq mi)
- Elevation: 369 m (1,211 ft)

Population (2011)
  - Total: 8,057
  - Density: 2,490/km^{2} (6,460/sq mi)

Languages
  - Official: Tamil
- Time zone: UTC+5:30 (IST)
- PIN: 635810
- STD code: 04171
- Vehicle registration: TN-23

Erikuthi is a village in PERNAMBUT Taluk, Vellore District, Tamil Nadu, India. It lies near the state boundary with Andhra Pradesh, about 16 kilometres west of the subdistrict capital Gudiyatham, and 45 kilometres west of the district capital Vellore. As of 2011, it had a population of 8,057.

== Geography ==
Erikuthi is situated in a mountainous and forested region. It has an total land area of 323.35 hectares.

== Demographics ==
According to the 2011 Census of India, there were 1,723 households within the village. Among the population, 3,908 are male and 4,149 are female. The overall literacy rate was 55.84%, with 2,363 of the male population and 2,136 of the female population being literate. Its census location code was 630285.
