= S. Kathavarayan =

Indian politician (c.1962–2020)

S. Kathavarayan (c. 1962 – 28 February 2020) was an Indian politician and a member of the Legislative Assembly of Tamil Nadu. He was elected to the Tamil Nadu legislative assembly as a Dravida Munnetra Kazhagam candidate from Gudiyattam constituency in the by-election in 2019. He died in Chennai where he was admitted for a heart ailment on 28 February 2020.
