= Vellore Assembly constituency =

State Legislative Assembly Constituency in Tamil Nadu

Coordinates: 12.920219°N 79.133306°E

Vellore
- Constituency No. 43 for the Tamil Nadu Legislative Assembly

Constituency details
- Country: India
- Region: South India
- State: Tamil Nadu
- District: Vellore
- Lok Sabha constituency: Vellore
- Established: 1951
- Total electors: 214,504

Member of Legislative Assembly
- 17th Tamil Nadu Legislative Assembly
- Incumbent M. M. Vinoth Kannan
- Party: TVK
- Elected year: 2026

Vellore is a legislative assembly constituency in the Indian state of Tamil Nadu. Its State Assembly Constituency number is 43. It includes the city of Vellore and forms a part of Vellore Lok Sabha constituency for national elections to the Parliament of India. It is one of the 234 State Legislative Assembly Constituencies in Tamil Nadu in India.

Vellore was one of the 17 assembly constituencies to have VVPAT facility with EVMs in the 2016 Tamil Nadu Legislative Assembly election. The most successful party is DMK, which has been elected seven times.

== Members of Legislative Assembly ==
Year	Member	Political party
Madras State
1952	H. M. Jaganathan	Indian National Congress
1952	A. K. Masilamany Chetty	Indian National Congress
1957	M. P. Sarathy	Independent
1962	R. Jeevarathna Mudaliar	Indian National Congress
1967	M. P. Sarathy	Dravida Munnetra Kazhagam
Tamil Nadu
1971	M. P. Sarathy	Dravida Munnetra Kazhagam
1977	A. K. Ranganathan	All India Anna Dravida Munnetra Kazhagam
1980	V. M. Devaraj	Dravida Munnetra Kazhagam
1984	V. M. Devaraj	Dravida Munnetra Kazhagam
1989	V. M. Devaraj	Dravida Munnetra Kazhagam
1991	C. Gnanasekaran	Indian National Congress
1996	C. Gnanasekaran	Tamil Maanila Congress (Moopanar)
2001	C. Gnanasekaran	Tamil Maanila Congress (Moopanar)
2006	C. Gnanasekaran	Indian National Congress
2011	Dr. V. S. Vijay	All India Anna Dravida Munnetra Kazhagam
2016	P. Karthikeyan	Dravida Munnetra Kazhagam
2021	P. Karthikeyan	Dravida Munnetra Kazhagam
2026	M. M. Vinoth Kannan	Tamilaga Vettri Kazhagam

== Election results ==
Vote share of winning candidates
2026	38.24%
2021	47.24%
2016	51.53%
2011	50.82%
2006	47.25%
2001	52.46%
1996	70.86%
1991	58.30%
1989	47.37%
1984	54.01%
1980	49.68%
1977	30.47%
1971	52.85%
1967	58.96%
1962	40.61%
1957	45.40%
1952	16.76%

=== 2026 ===
2026 Tamil Nadu Legislative Assembly election: Vellore
Party	Candidate	Votes	%	±%
TVK	M.M. Vinoth Kannan	73,032	38.33	New
DMK	P. Karthikeyan	66,255	34.77	▼12.47
AIADMK	S.R.K. Appu	45,458	23.86	▼18.23
NTK	A. Soniya	3,793	1.99	▼2.79
NOTA	NOTA	757	0.40	▼0.41
Naam Indiar Party	K. Vimala	195	0.10	New
Independent	U. Vijaya Kumar	191	0.10	New
TVK	S.M. Irshad	135	0.07	New
Anna MGR Dravida Makkal Kalgam	M. Vinothkumar	131	0.07	New
Independent	S. Madhan Kumar	123	0.06	New
Party For The Rights Of Other Backward Classes	S. Giridhara Prasad	103	0.05	New
Independent	S. Appu	103	0.05	New
Viro Ke Vir Indian Party	K.M. Vinaayagam	88	0.05	New
Independent	M. Loganathan	59	0.03	New
ALL PENSIONER'S PARTY	K. Muniyappan	55	0.03	New
Independent	S. Rajkamal	49	0.03	New
Margin of victory		6,777	3.56	▼1.58
Turnout		1,90,527	88.64	▲18.12
Registered electors		2,14,946		▼38,103
TVK gain from DMK		Swing	▲38.33	

=== 2021 ===
2021 Tamil Nadu Legislative Assembly election: Vellore
Party	Candidate	Votes	%	±%
DMK	P. Karthikeyan	84,299	47.24%	−4.29
AIADMK	S. R. K. Appu	75,118	42.09%	+5.86
NTK	N. Poonkundran	8,530	4.78%	+3.82
MNM	G. Vikram Chakravarthy	7,243	4.06%	New
NOTA	NOTA	1,441	0.81%	−0.59
Tamil Nadu Ilangyar Katchi	R. Naresh Kumar	928	0.52%	New
Margin of victory		9,181	5.14%	−10.16%
Turnout		178,458	70.52%	1.93%
Rejected ballots		324	0.18%	
Registered electors		253,049		
DMK hold		Swing	-4.29%	

=== 2016 ===
2016 Tamil Nadu Legislative Assembly election: Vellore
Party	Candidate	Votes	%	±%
DMK	P. Karthikeyan	88,264	51.53%	New
AIADMK	Harun Rasheed	62,054	36.23%	−14.59
BJP	S. Elangovan	5,212	3.04%	−0.04
PMK	D. Lakshmi Narayanan	5,185	3.03%	New
VCK	A. R. Abdur Rahman	2,590	1.51%	New
NOTA	NOTA	2,400	1.40%	New
NTK	A. Manigandan	1,639	0.96%	New
SDPI	Shaik Meeran	1,100	0.64%	New
Margin of victory		26,210	15.30%	4.52%
Turnout		171,279	68.59%	−5.00%
Registered electors		249,715		
DMK gain from AIADMK		Swing	0.71%	

=== 2011 ===
2011 Tamil Nadu Legislative Assembly election: Vellore
Party	Candidate	Votes	%	±%
AIADMK	Dr. V. S. Vijay	71,522	50.82%	New
INC	C. Gnanasekharan	56,346	40.04%	−7.21
Independent	J. Hassan	5,273	3.75%	New
BJP	Dr. V. Aravinth	4,334	3.08%	+1.48
Independent	V. S. Elumalai	1,333	0.95%	New
Margin of victory		15,176	10.78%	−5.35%
Turnout		140,740	73.59%	8.34%
Registered electors		191,251		
AIADMK gain from INC		Swing	3.57%	

=== 2006 ===
2006 Tamil Nadu Legislative Assembly election: Vellore
Party	Candidate	Votes	%	±%
INC	C. Gnanasekharan	63,957	47.25%	New
MDMK	N. Subramani	42,120	31.12%	+29.3
SP	G. G. Ravi	15,710	11.61%	New
DMDK	A. Rajenderan	9,549	7.05%	New
BJP	K. Kalaiselvi	2,161	1.60%	New
Margin of victory		21,837	16.13%	6.52%
Turnout		135,359	65.25%	10.79%
Registered electors		207,448		
INC gain from TMC(M)		Swing	-5.21%	

=== 2001 ===
2001 Tamil Nadu Legislative Assembly election: Vellore
Party	Candidate	Votes	%	±%
TMC(M)	C. Gnanasekharan	60,697	52.46%	New
DMK	A. M. Ramalingam	49,573	42.84%	New
MDMK	S. Rajasekaran	2,098	1.81%	−3.66
Independent	R. Abdul Jameel	1,192	1.03%	New
Independent	A. Ramu	959	0.83%	New
Margin of victory		11,124	9.61%	−42.79%
Turnout		115,708	54.46%	−6.96%
Registered electors		212,486		
TMC(M) hold		Swing	-18.41%	

=== 1996 ===
1996 Tamil Nadu Legislative Assembly election: Vellore
Party	Candidate	Votes	%	±%
TMC(M)	C. Gnanasekharan	82,339	70.86%	New
INC	S. B. Bhaskaran	21,451	18.46%	−39.84
MDMK	N. Subramani	6,359	5.47%	New
AIIC(T)	D. Chidambaram	3,009	2.59%	New
BJP	K. Sekar	1,447	1.25%	New
Margin of victory		60,888	52.40%	30.25%
Turnout		116,193	61.42%	6.33%
Registered electors		194,734		
TMC(M) gain from INC		Swing	12.56%	

=== 1991 ===
1991 Tamil Nadu Legislative Assembly election: Vellore
Party	Candidate	Votes	%	±%
INC	C. Gnanasekharan	60,698	58.30%	+40.76
DMK	A. M. Ramalingam	37,632	36.15%	−11.23
IUML	M. M. Habibullah	3,973	3.82%	New
JP	R. Loganathan	828	0.80%	New
Margin of victory		23,066	22.16%	3.98%
Turnout		104,111	55.09%	−10.72%
Registered electors		192,744		
INC gain from DMK		Swing	10.93%	

=== 1989 ===
1989 Tamil Nadu Legislative Assembly election: Vellore
Party	Candidate	Votes	%	±%
DMK	V. M. Devaraj	50,470	47.37%	−6.64
AIADMK	P. Neelakandan	31,110	29.20%	−14.87
INC	A. K. Shanmugasudaram	18,683	17.54%	New
Independent	V. Jaganmohan Alias Sivajimohan	4,535	4.26%	New
Independent	M. Ilamathi	856	0.80%	New
Margin of victory		19,360	18.17%	8.23%
Turnout		106,539	65.81%	−7.60%
Registered electors		164,678		
DMK hold		Swing	-6.64%	

=== 1984 ===
1984 Tamil Nadu Legislative Assembly election: Vellore
Party	Candidate	Votes	%	±%
DMK	V. M. Devaraj	54,453	54.01%	+4.33
AIADMK	A. K. Ranganathan	44,430	44.07%	−0.42
INC(J)	Kulasekaran	1,078	1.07%	New
Independent	M. Arumugam Alias Vidivelli Arumugam	552	0.55%	New
Margin of victory		10,023	9.94%	4.75%
Turnout		100,823	73.41%	9.27%
Registered electors		141,315		
DMK hold		Swing	4.33%	

=== 1980 ===
1980 Tamil Nadu Legislative Assembly election: Vellore
Party	Candidate	Votes	%	±%
DMK	V. M. Devaraj	43,126	49.68%	+25.35
AIADMK	A. K. Ranganathan	38,619	44.49%	+14.02
JP	K. Eswaran	4,489	5.17%	New
Margin of victory		4,507	5.19%	4.24%
Turnout		86,803	64.14%	−3.48%
Registered electors		136,560		
DMK gain from AIADMK		Swing	19.21%	

=== 1977 ===
1977 Tamil Nadu Legislative Assembly election: Vellore
Party	Candidate	Votes	%	±%
AIADMK	A. K. Ranganathan	26,590	30.47%	New
JP	A. K. Lalalajpathy	25,758	29.52%	New
DMK	V. M. Devaraj	21,229	24.33%	−28.52
INC	V. Dakshinamoorthy	12,043	13.80%	−30.14
Independent	G. Moorthv	1,064	1.22%	New
Margin of victory		832	0.95%	−7.95%
Turnout		87,258	67.63%	−3.80%
Registered electors		130,154		
AIADMK gain from DMK		Swing	-22.38%	

=== 1971 ===
1971 Tamil Nadu Legislative Assembly election: Vellore
Party	Candidate	Votes	%	±%
DMK	M. P. Sarathy	38,968	52.85%	−6.11
INC	A. K. Lalalajapathy	32,401	43.94%	+6.3
Independent	Iiamathi	1,587	2.15%	New
Independent	Abdul Khader Jamali	665	0.90%	New
Margin of victory		6,567	8.91%	−12.41%
Turnout		73,735	71.43%	−7.54%
Registered electors		106,424		
DMK hold		Swing	-6.11%	

=== 1967 ===
1967 Madras Legislative Assembly election: Vellore
Party	Candidate	Votes	%	±%
DMK	M. P. Sarathy	39,863	58.96%	+18.63
INC	J. Mudaliar	25,449	37.64%	−2.97
RPI	V. K. Damodaran	1,209	1.79%	New
Independent	M. Chettiar	550	0.81%	New
Independent	Mani	350	0.52%	New
Margin of victory		14,414	21.32%	21.03%
Turnout		67,613	78.97%	3.17%
Registered electors		88,490		
DMK gain from INC		Swing	18.34%	

=== 1962 ===
1962 Madras Legislative Assembly election: Vellore
Party	Candidate	Votes	%	±%
INC	R. Jeevarathna Mudaliar	26,739	40.61%	+19.56
DMK	M. P. Sarathy	26,549	40.32%	New
CPI	Sundaram	11,760	17.86%	−15.68
Independent	W. Rajammal	412	0.63%	New
Independent	Subramani	378	0.57%	New
Margin of victory		190	0.29%	−11.57%
Turnout		65,838	75.80%	30.11%
Registered electors		90,029		
INC gain from Independent		Swing	-4.79%	

=== 1957 ===
1957 Madras Legislative Assembly election: Vellore
Party	Candidate	Votes	%	±%
Independent	M. P. Sarathy	18,520	45.40%	New
CPI	Sundara Gounder	13,683	33.55%	+22.87
INC	V. M. Ramasamy Mudaliar	8,586	21.05%	+4.29
Margin of victory		4,837	11.86%	11.34%
Turnout		40,789	45.68%	−45.54%
Registered electors		89,284		
Independent gain from INC		Swing	28.65%	

=== 1952 ===
1952 Madras Legislative Assembly election: Vellore
Party	Candidate	Votes	%	±%
INC	A. K. Masilamani Chetty	23,422	16.76%	New
Commonweal Party	R. Radhakrishnan	22,701	16.24%	New
INC	H. M. Jagnanathan	21,406	15.32%	New
CPI	K. R. Sundaram	14,924	10.68%	New
Independent	T. Abdul Wahib	11,232	8.04%	New
RPI	A. Daivasingamani	10,704	7.66%	New
KMPP	A. Kuppuswami Mudali	10,446	7.47%	New
Independent	M. Moorthy	6,915	4.95%	New
Akhil Bharat Hindu Maha Sabha	D. Srinivasa Mudali	6,342	4.54%	New
Independent	M. Adimoolam	5,898	4.22%	New
KMPP	K. V. Govindaswami	5,769	4.13%	New
Margin of victory		721	0.52%	
Turnout		139,759	91.23%	
Registered electors		153,200		
INC win (new seat)				
