= K. Kamaraj =

Indian politician (1903–1975)

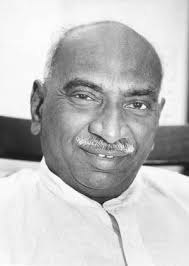
- Portrait of Kamaraj

3rd Chief Minister of Madras State
- In office 13 April 1954 – 2 October 1963
- Governor: Sri Prakasa; A. J. John; P. V. Rajamannar; Bishnuram Medhi
- Preceded by: C. Rajagopalachari
- Succeeded by: M. Bhakthavatsalam
- Constituency: Gudiyattam; Sattur

Member of Parliament, Lok Sabha
- In office 13 May 1952 – 12 April 1954
- Prime Minister: Jawaharlal Nehru
- Preceded by: position established
- Succeeded by: U. Muthuramalingam Thevar
- Constituency: Srivilliputhur
- In office 9 January 1969 – 2 October 1975
- Prime Minister: Indira Gandhi
- Preceded by: A. Nesamony
- Succeeded by: Kumari Ananthan
- Constituency: Nagercoil

Member of the Madras State Legislative Assembly
- In office 29 April 1957 – 28 February 1967
- Chief Minister: Himself; M. Bhakthavatsalam
- Preceded by: S. Ramaswamy
- Succeeded by: S. Ramaswamy
- Constituency: Sattur
- In office 6 August 1954 – 31 March 1957
- Chief Minister: Himself
- Preceded by: A. J. Arunachalam
- Succeeded by: V. K. Kothandaraman
- Constituency: Gudiyatham

President of the Indian National Congress
- In office 1964–1967
- Preceded by: Neelam Sanjiva Reddy
- Succeeded by: S. Nijalingappa

President of the Indian National Congress (Organisation)
- In office 12 November 1969 – 2 October 1975
- Preceded by: position established
- Succeeded by: Morarji Desai

President of the Tamil Nadu Pradesh Congress Committee
- In office 1946–1952
- Preceded by: Tanguturi Prakasam
- Succeeded by: P. Subbarayan

Personal details
- Born: Kamatchi; 15 July 1903 Virudhupatti, Madras Presidency, British India
- Died: 2 October 1975 (aged 72) Madras, Tamil Nadu, India
- Resting place: Kamarajar Memorial, Chennai
- Party: Indian National Congress (O) (1969–75); Indian National Congress (until 1969)
- Occupation: Freedom fighter; Activist; Politician
- Awards: Bharat Ratna (1976); Copper Bond Award (1972)
- Nicknames: Karmaveerar (Man of action); Perunthalaivar (Great leader); Kalvi Thanthai (Father of education); Padikkatha Methai (Uneducated genius); Black Gandhi

Kumaraswami Kamaraj (15 July 1903 – 2 October 1975), popularly known as Kamarajar, was an Indian independence activist, politician, social reformer, and statesman who served as the Chief Minister of Madras from 13 April 1954 to 2 October 1963. He also served as the president of the Indian National Congress from 1964 to 1967 and was responsible for the elevation of Lal Bahadur Shastri and later Indira Gandhi to the position of Prime Minister of India, because of which he was widely acknowledged as the "Kingmaker" in Indian politics during the 1960s. Later, he became the founder and president of the Indian National Congress (O).

Born as Kamatchi, Kamaraj dropped out of school early and had little formal education. He became active in the Indian Independence movement in the 1920s and was imprisoned by the British Raj multiple times due to his activities. In 1937, Kamaraj was elected to the Madras Legislative Assembly after winning in the 1937 Madras Presidency Legislative Assembly election. He was active during the Quit India Movement in 1942, because of which he was incarcerated for three years until 1945.

After Indian Independence in 1947, Kamaraj served as a Member of Parliament in the Lok Sabha from 1952 to 1954 before becoming the Chief Minister of Madras State in April 1954. During his almost decade-long tenure as the chief minister, he played a major role in developing the infrastructure of the state and improving the quality of life of the needy and the disadvantaged. He was responsible for introducing free education to children and expanded the free Midday Meal Scheme, which resulted in significant improvement in school enrollment and growth of literacy rates in the state over the decade. He is widely known as Kalvi Thanthai (Father of education) because of his role in improving the educational infrastructure.

Kamaraj was known for his simplicity and integrity. He remained a bachelor throughout his life and did not own any property when he died in 1975. Hubert Humphrey, former Vice President of the United States, referred to Kamaraj as one of the greatest political leaders in the world. He was awarded with India's highest civilian honour, the Bharat Ratna, posthumously in 1976.

== Early life ==
Kamaraj was born on 15 July 1903 in Virudhupatti (now Virudhunagar), Madras Presidency, to Kumaraswami Nadar and Sivakami Ammal. His father Kumaraswami was a coconut merchant and his parents named him Kamatchi, after their family deity. His parents called him Raja, and the portmanteau of both these names led him to be known as Kamaraj. He had a younger sister named Nagammal.

At the age of five, Kamaraj was enrolled in the local elementary school before being admitted to a different school. His grandfather and father died in quick succession when he was only six years old, forcing his grandmother and mother to support the family. He dropped out of school at the age of 12 and started to work in the cloth shop run by his maternal uncle Karuppaih Nadar. He learnt the martial art silambam and boxing. He also spent time singing bhajans of Murugan along with the locals.

=== Political interests ===
Kamaraj showed an interest in public happenings and politics from the age of 13. While working in his uncle's shop, he began to attend panchayats and other political meetings addressed by activists such as P. Varadarajulu Naidu and George Joseph. He keenly followed the Tamil daily Swadesamitran and often discussed the happenings with people of his age at the shop.

Kamaraj was attracted by Annie Besant's Home Rule Movement and inspired by the writings of Bankim Chandra Chatterjee and Subramania Bharati. Due to his growing inclination towards politics and neglect of the business, he was sent to Thiruvananthapuram to work at a timber shop owned by another of his relatives. While in Kerala, he continued to participate in public activities and took part in the Vaikom Satyagraha, which was conducted for to gain access to the prohibited public areas of the Vaikom Sree Mahadeva Temple to people of all castes. He was called back to his native place, and despite attempts by his mother to find him a bride, refused to get married.

== Independence activism ==
=== Early years (1919–29) ===
After the passage of the Rowlatt Act of 1919 by the British Raj which indefinitely extended preventive detention and imprisonment of Indians without trial and the subsequent Jallianwala Bagh massacre, where hundreds of peaceful protesters against the act were shot down, Kamaraj decided to join Indian National Congress at the age of 16.

On 21 September 1921, Kamaraj met Mahatma Gandhi for the first time during a meeting in Madurai and was influenced by his views on prohibition of alcohol, usage of khadi, nonviolence and eradication of untouchability. In 1922, he traveled to Chennai to take part in protests against the visit of Prince of Wales as a part of the Non-cooperation movement. He was later elected to be a part of the town committee of the Congress in Virudhunagar. As a part of the role, he collected donations to finance the printing of speeches of Gandhi and distributed them to the people to induce them to join the Indian independence movement. In the next few years, Kamaraj participated in the Flag Satyagraha in Nagpur and the Sword Satyagraha in Madras. He organized regular meetings of the Congress in the Madurai district and started orating.

=== Salt march and first election (1930–39) ===
In 1930, Kamaraj participated in the Vedaranyam march organized by C. Rajagopalachari (Rajaji) in support of Gandhi's Salt March. He was arrested for the first time and was imprisoned in Alipore Jail for almost two years. He was released before he served the two-year sentence as the Gandhi–Irwin Pact in 1931. In 1931, he was appointed as a member of All India Congress Committee. In the next decade, the Congress in Madras province was divided into two factions, one led by Rajaji and the other led by S. Satyamurti. Kamaraj supported Satyamurti, as he aligned closely with the ideals propagated by him. Satyamurti became his political guru while Kamaraj became a trusted aide of Satyamurti. In the 1931 elections to the regional unit of the Congress, he helped Satyamurti to win the post of vice-president. In 1932, Kamaraj was arrested again on charges of sedition and inciting violence. He was sentenced to one year of rigorous imprisonment at Tiruchirappalli. He was later transferred to Vellore Central Prison, where he developed an association with revolutionaries like Jaidev Kapoor and Kamal Nath Tewari. In 1933-34, Kamaraj was charged with a conspiracy to murder John Anderson, then Governor of Bengal, which was part of a larger Madras Conspiracy Case. He was accused of supplying arms but was acquitted due to lack of evidence in 1935.

On 21 September 1933, a post office and the police station in Virudhunagar were bombed. On 9 November, Kamaraj was implicated in the bombing despite the local police inspector giving a statement to the contrary. Indian police officials along with the British officers engaged in coercive tactics and harassment to try to force a confession in the case. Varadarajulu Naidu and George Joseph argued on Kamaraj's behalf in court and the charges were proved to be baseless. Despite his acquittal, Kamaraj had sold most of his ancestral properties except his house to finance the case. In the 1934 elections, he organized the campaign for Congress and was appointed the general secretary of the provincial congress committee in 1936. In 1937, in the Madras Presidency Legislative Assembly election, Kamaraj was elected as a member of legislative assembly (MLA) with the Congress gaining a simple majority, winning 156 of the 219 seats.

=== Congress presidency and imprisonment (1940–45) ===
In 1940, Kamaraj was elected as the president of the Provincial Congress Committee with Satyamurti serving as the general secretary. He conducted a campaign asking people not to contribute to war funds when Arthur Hope, the Governor of Madras, was collecting contributions to fund the Allies in the Second World War. In December 1940, he was arrested under the Defence of India Rules for speeches that opposed contributions to the war fund, and sent to the Vellore Central Prison. While in jail, he was elected as a municipal councillor and chairman of Virudhunagar municipality on 31 May 1941. He was released from prison on 3 November 1941 and was handed the chairmanship of the council on 16 March 1942. He resigned from the post immediately as he thought he had greater responsibility for the nation and further stated that "One should not accept any post to which one could not do full justice".

In August 1942, Kamaraj attended the All India Congress Committee in Bombay and returned to spread propaganda material for the Quit India Movement. The police were issued orders to arrest all the leaders who attended the Bombay session. Kamaraj did not want to be arrested before he passed on the message to the local leaders and evaded arrest by various means. After finishing his work, he surrendered to the police to be arrested. While he was in jail, Satyamurti died in March 1943. He was under detention for three years before being released in June 1945 and this was his last and longest term of imprisonment. Kamaraj was imprisoned six times by the British for his pro-Independence activities, totalling to more than 3,000 days in jail.

== Political career after independence ==
=== Rising influence (1946–53) ===
After his release from jail, Kamaraj found that the Congress had weakened significantly as Rajaji had resigned from the party and Satyamurti had died. While he met with Rajaji to set aside their differences, it did not work out as Rajaji was readmitted to the party against the wishes of Kamaraj. On the advice of Sardar Patel, a truce was brokered later. In 1946, after Gandhi's visit to Madras, Gandhi wrote that Rajaji was the best leader of the party in the presidency and some people are working against him. Kamaraj construed this as an indirect reference to him and resigned from the parliamentary board of the party. Despite Gandhi's later appeal, Kamaraj refused to take back his resignation. Meanwhile, Kamaraj had considerable influence with the party which led Rajaji to take a sabbatical.

In the 1946 Madras Presidency Legislative Assembly election, Kamaraj won from Sattur-Aruppukottai and Congress emerged as the largest party. Tanguturi Prakasam was made Chief Minister but was replaced by O. P. Ramaswamy within a year due to his differences with Kamaraj. Ramaswamy himself was succeeded by P. S. Kumaraswamy Raja in 1949 after disagreements with Kamaraj. During the period, Kamaraj wielded considerable influence on the party affairs as the president of the Congress party. As India achieved Independence on 15 August 1947, Kamaraj hoisted the Indian flag at Satyamurti's house in Madras. In the Indian general elections of 1951, Kamaraj won from Srivalliputhur constituency and became the Member of Parliament.

In the 1952 Madras State Legislative Assembly election, Congress fared poorly, winning less than half of the seats (152 out of 375). Though it emerged as the single largest party, Kamaraj did not want to form a Congress government as it did not have a majority on its own. But the central committee was keen for that Congress form the government and it was decided that Rajaji who had gone on a sabbatical after serving as the Governor General of India was the right person to lead. Rajaji wanted Kamaraj's support and after consultations with the then Prime Minister of India Jawaharlal Nehru, Rajaji formed the government. Kamaraj resigned from the post of presidency of the party after 12 years, suggesting that someone who can work with Rajaji should be elected president. P. Subbarayan was elected as president but made way for Kamaraj to become president again in 1953.

=== Chief Minister of Madras (1954–63) ===
In 1953, Andhra state was separated from Madras state and the Modified Scheme of Elementary Education was construed as perpetuating the caste hierarchy. These forced Rajaji to resign and after much deliberation, Kamaraj was asked to take over as chief minister, which was opposed by C. Subramaniam, who had been nominated by Rajaji. Kamaraj was elected by the legislators as the leader of the party and assumed the office of the Chief Minister of Madras state on 13 April 1954. Kamaraj resigned as member of parliament and opted to contest in the by-elections to the Gudiyatham Assembly constituency rather than get elected as a Member of Legislative Council. In the by-elections, he was supported by prominent people across party lines including Periyar E. V. Ramasami and C. N. Annadurai. He defeated V. K. Kothandaraman of the Communist Party of India in the election and the opposition later claimed that the Congress bribed the voters with food coupons.

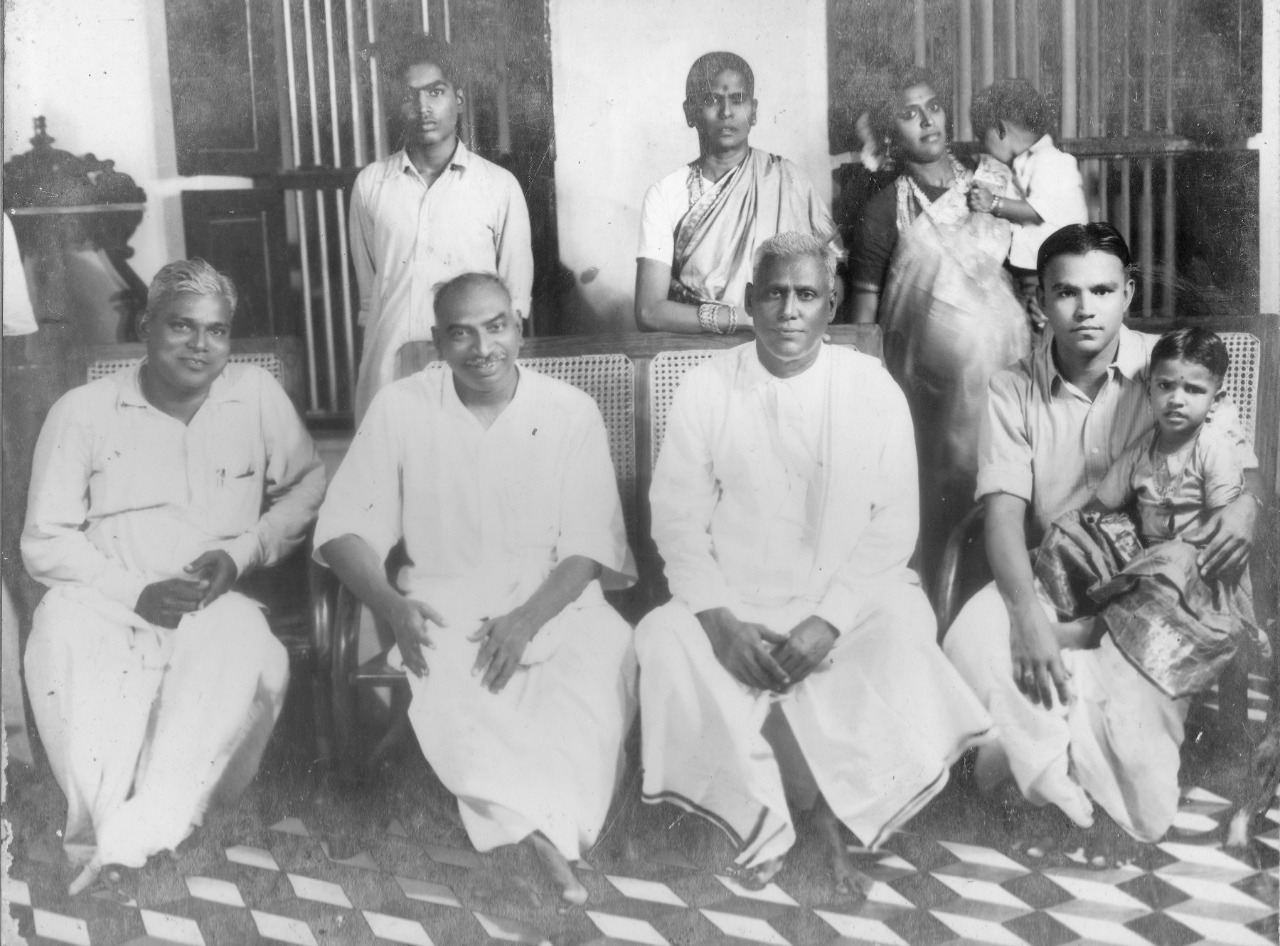
Kamaraj (second from left) during a visit to a party member's house in 1955

Kamaraj nominated C. Subramaniam, who had contested his leadership, to the newly formed cabinet. Throughout his tenure, he had a small cabinet with a maximum of eight ministers as he believed in efficiency of a compact cabinet and often selected his ministers based on knowledge and capability. Kamaraj made effective use of the Five-Year Plans of India to aid in the development of the state. He formed state development committees consisting of ministers and bureaucrats which formulated plans for the development and reviewed the implementation across various departments.

Kamaraj brought major changes to the education system and infrastructure. The family vocation based Modified Scheme of Elementary Education introduced earlier was withdrawn and school education was made free for children up to eleven years. In order to ensure that students do not walk long distances, the educational policy stipulated that a school should be opened within a 3 km (1.9 mi) radius. As a result, about 6,000 schools closed previously and 12,000 new schools were added. When it was found that the enrollment was still low and the children were malnourished, Kamaraj expanded the Midday Meal Scheme to all schools to provide at least one free meal per day. Schemes were introduced wherein public help and contributions were sought to finance and improve educational infrastructure in the respective communities. Free uniforms were introduced to weed out distinctions based on caste and class in schools.

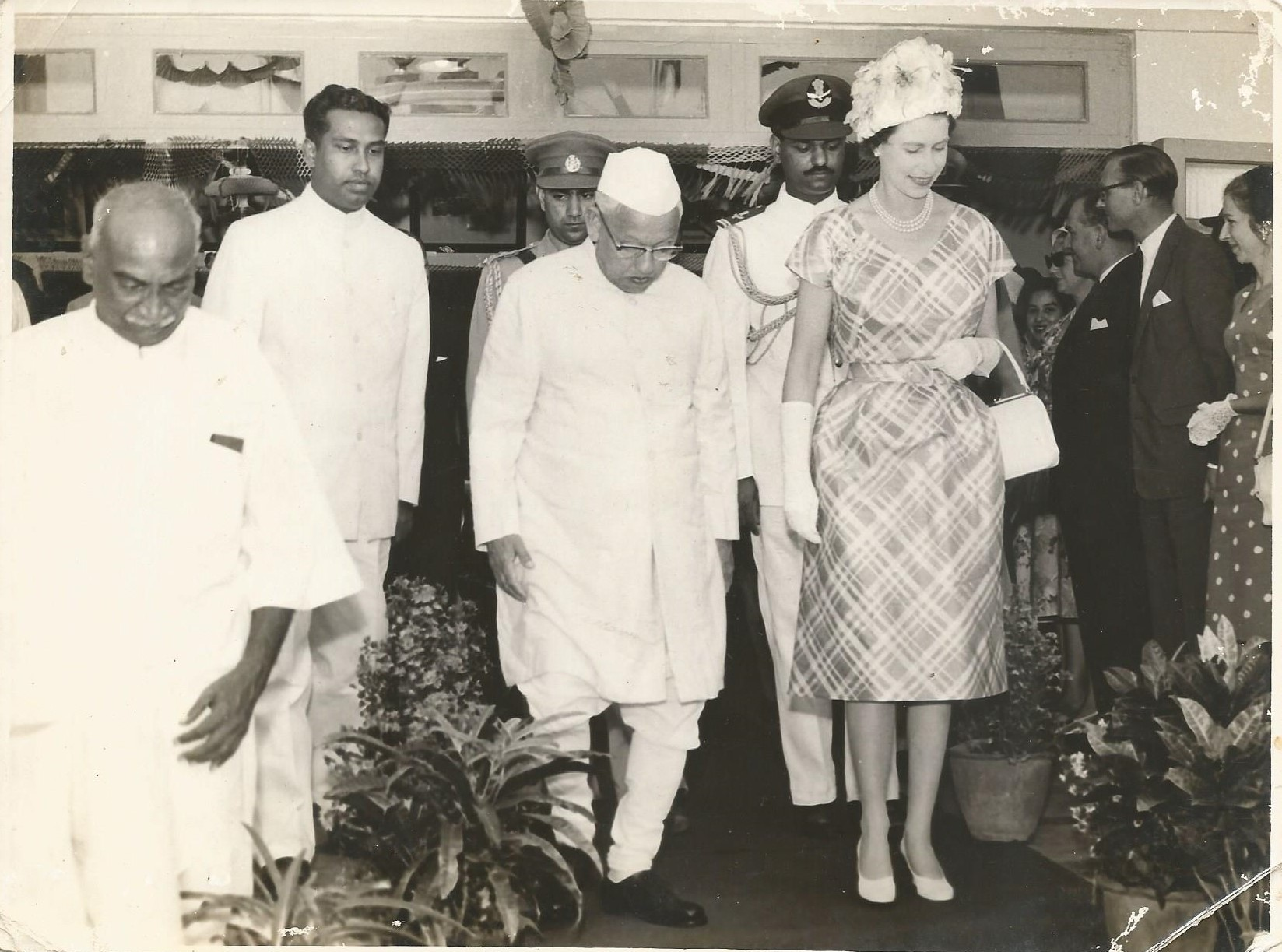
Kamaraj (left) during Queen Elizabeth II's visit to India in 1961

The education system was reformed to incorporate a new syllabus and the number of working days was increased. New institutions of higher education were established including IIT Madras in 1959. The efforts resulted in significant improvement in school enrollment and growth of literacy rates in the state over the decade (18.33% in 1951 to 36.39% in 1961), which earned him the moniker Kalvi Thanthai (Father of education).

Major irrigation schemes and dams were planned and implemented during his tenure. Small and medium-sized enterprises were encouraged to increase the utilization of local resources and electrification support was provided by the Government. Public sector industries including Integral Coach Factory at Chennai, Heavy Vehicles Factory at Avadi, Neyveli Lignite Corporation, BHEL at Tiruchirappalli, Manali Refinery, Hindustan Photo Films at Udagamandalam were established.

Kamaraj remained Chief Minister for three consecutive terms, winning elections in 1957 and 1962. By the mid 1960s, Kamaraj noticed that the Congress party was slowly losing its vigour, and he offered to resign from the post of the chief minister to focus on rebuilding the party. On Gandhi Jayanti, 2 October 1963, he resigned from the post of the chief minister and at the time of resignation, he was the longest serving chief minister in any state in India.

=== National politics and final years (1964–75) ===
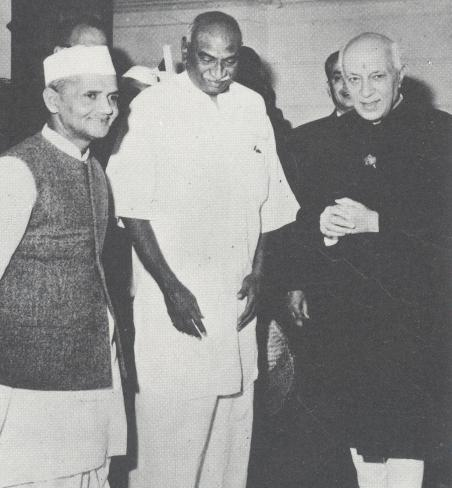
Kamaraj (center) with Jawaharlal Nehru (right) and Lal Bahadur Shastri (left)

After his resignation as the Chief Minister, Kamaraj proposed that all senior Congress leaders should resign from their posts and devote their energy to the revitalisation of the Congress party. He suggested to the Prime Minister Nehru that senior Congress leaders should leave ministerial posts to take up organizational work. This suggestion came to be known as the Kamaraj Plan, which was designed to alleviate the notion that the party members are lured by power and to create a dedication to the values and objectives of the party. Six union ministers and six chief ministers of the Congress followed suit and resigned from their posts. Kamaraj was elected as the President of Indian National Congress on 9 October 1963.

After Nehru's untimely death in 1964, Kamaraj successfully navigated the Congress party through turbulent times. Despite being the president of the party, he refused to become the next prime minister himself and was instrumental in bringing to power two prime ministers, Lal Bahadur Shastri in 1964 and Nehru's daughter Indira Gandhi in 1966. For this role, he was widely acclaimed as the "kingmaker" during the 1960s.

In 1965, during the food crisis, Kamaraj worked with then Minister of Finance T. T. Krishnamachari to introduce ration cards and food rationing. The food crisis, Anti-Hindi agitations and disillusionment with the Congress party led to the defeat of the Congress against the Dravida Munnetra Kazhagam (DMK) in the 1967 Madras State Legislative Assembly election. Kamaraj himself was defeated for the first time in the elections. The death of the incumbent member of Nagercoil Lok Sabha constituency in 1968 led to a by-election. Despite the opposition of the DMK led state government and Rajaji, Kamaraj won the elections on 8 January 1969.

Ever since the appointment of Indira Gandhi as the Prime Minister, friction developed between her and the top leaders of the Congress, termed as the "syndicate", led by Kamaraj. After the Congress victory in the 1967 Indian general election, the rift began to widen and Indira Gandhi was expelled from the party for anti-party activities in 1969. This resulted in the split of the Congress party with Kamaraj heading the INC (O) faction. Indira Gandhi stayed as the Prime Minister with the support of smaller regional parties and dissolved the Lok Sabha to call for fresh elections in 1970. In the 1971 Indian general election, the INC (O) performed very poorly, winning just 16 seats compared to the 352 won by the Indira-led faction. He remained as part of INC(O) until his death in 1975.

=== Electoral history ===
Election results
Year	Position	Constituency	Party	Result	Reference
1937	Member of Legislative Assembly, Tamil Nadu	Sattur	Indian National Congress	Won	
1946	Member of Legislative Assembly, Tamil Nadu	Sattur-Aruppukottai	Indian National Congress	Won	
1951	Member of Parliament, Lok Sabha	Srivilliputhur	Indian National Congress	Won	
1954	Member of Legislative Assembly, Tamil Nadu	Gudiyatham	Indian National Congress	Won	
1957	Member of Legislative Assembly, Tamil Nadu	Sattur	Indian National Congress	Won	
1962	Member of Legislative Assembly, Tamil Nadu	Sattur	Indian National Congress	Won	
1967	Member of Legislative Assembly, Tamil Nadu	Virudhunagar	Indian National Congress	Lost	
1969	Member of Parliament, Lok Sabha	Nagercoil	Indian National Congress	Won	
1971	Member of Parliament, Lok Sabha	Nagercoil	Indian National Congress (Organisation)	Won	

== Death ==
On 2 October 1975, Kamaraj complained of chest pain after lunch. He died in his sleep due to a heart attack, at the age of 72. His body was kept for public viewing at Rajaji Hall. On the following day, it was taken in procession to Gandhi Mandapam and cremated with full state honors. Memorials dedicated to Kamaraj have been established in Chennai, Virudhunagar and Kanyakumari.

== Legacy ==
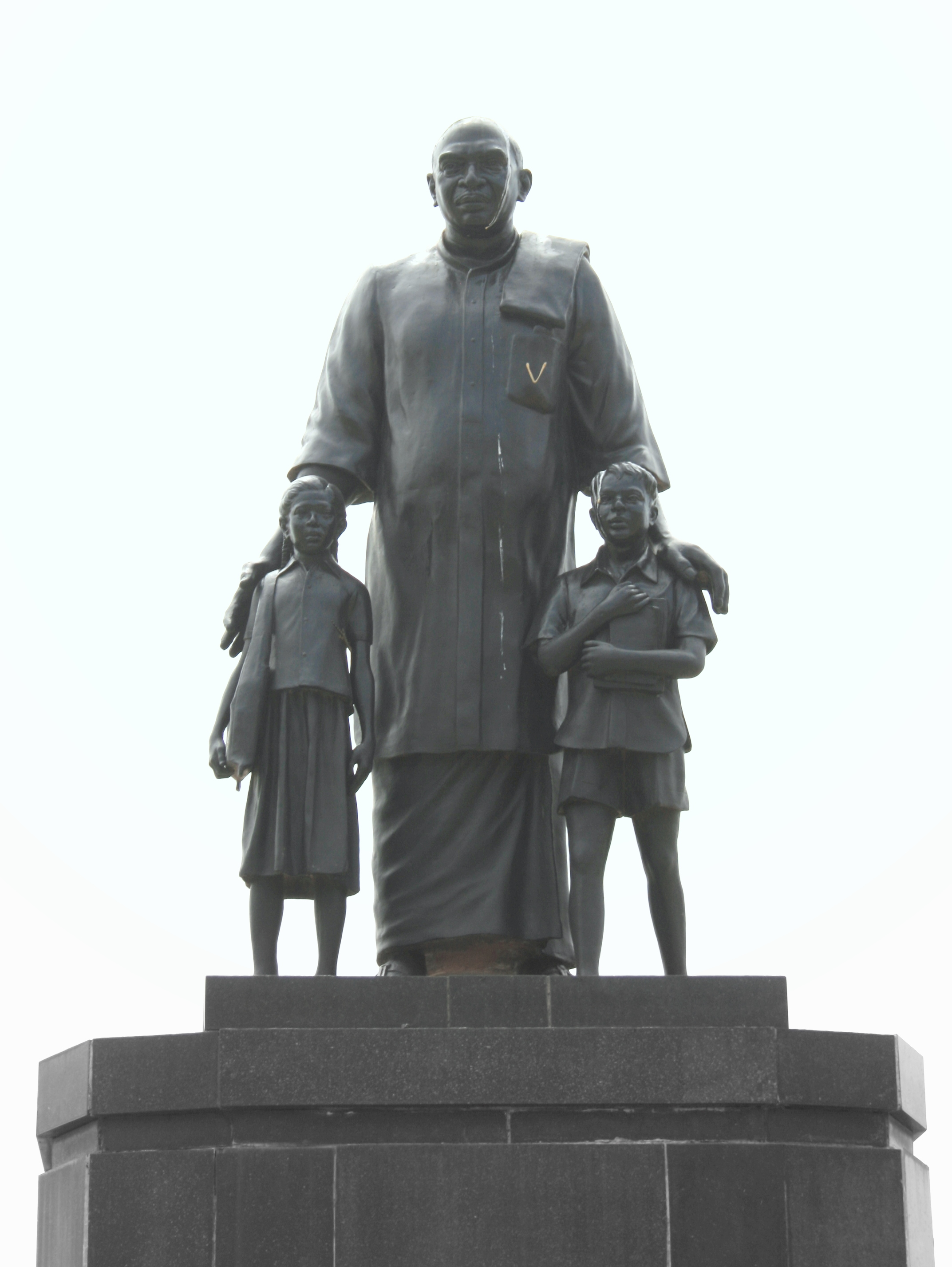
Kamaraj Statue in Marina Beach, Chennai depicting his contribution to education in the state

Kamaraj spent most of his career in politics and did not spend much time on relationships and family. Kamaraj was known for his simplicity and integrity. He followed Gandhian principles, wore a simple khadi shirt and dhoti and was often referred to as Black Gandhi by the people. He ate a simple meal and refused special privileges. During his tenure as Chief Minister, when the municipality of Virudhunagar provided a direct water connection to his house, Kamarajar ordered it to be disconnected immediately as he did not want any special privileges and opined that public agencies should serve the public and not private individuals. He often refused police protection and security, determining it as waste of public resources. Kamaraj did not own any property and had a mere ₹130, two pairs of sandals, four pairs of shirts and dhotis apart from a few books in his possession when he died.

He was a man of action who believed that any goal could be realized through the correct means and is often referred to as Karma Veerar (man of action) and Perunthalaivar (great or tall leader) in Tamil. Hubert Humphrey, former Vice President of the United States, referred to Kamaraj as one of the greatest political leaders in all the world. Though he lacked a formal higher education, he showed good intelligence, intuitiveness and understanding of human nature, which led to him being called by the epithet of Padikkatha Methai (uneducated genius).

In 1976, Kamaraj was posthumously awarded Bharat Ratna, India's highest civilian honor. In 2004, Government of India issued special commemorative coins of ₹100 and ₹5 denomination to mark the centenary celebrations of his birth.

Many public places, roads and buildings are named after Kamaraj. Madurai University was renamed as Madurai Kamaraj University in his honor. The old domestic terminal of Chennai International Airport is named "Kamaraj Terminal". The port at Ennore in North Chennai has been named Kamarajar Port Limited. The railway station at Maraimalai Nagar, a municipality south of Chennai, is named as Maraimalai Nagar Kamarajar Railway Station. Major roads bearing his name include the North Parade Road in Bengaluru, Marina Beach Road in Chennai, and Parliament Road in New Delhi. There are many statues dedicated to him across India including at the Parliament of India in New Delhi and the Marina Beach facade in Chennai to honor him.

== Popular culture ==
In 2004, a Tamil film titled Kamaraj was released, based on Kamaraj's life.

== Bibliography ==
- Kandaswamy, P. (2001). Political Career of K. Kamraj. Concept Publishing Company. ISBN 978-8-170-22801-1.
- Murthi, R. K. (2005). Encyclopedia of Bharat Ratnas. Pitambar Publishing. ISBN 978-8-120-91307-3.
- Narasimhan, V. K.; Narayanan, V. N. (2007). Kamaraj, a Study. National Book Trust. ISBN 978-8-123-74876-4.
- Parthasarathi, R. (1982). Builders of modern India:K. Kamaraj (PDF). Ministry of Information and Broadcasting, Government of India. ISBN 978-8-123-01293-3.
- Sanjeev, Sudha; Nair, Bhavana (1989). Remembering Our Leaders. Vol. 7. Children's Book Trust. ISBN 978-8-170-11767-4.
