= C. Gnanasekharan =

Indian politician

C. Gnanasekaran is an Indian politician and former Member of the Legislative Assembly of Tamil Nadu. He was elected to the Tamil Nadu legislative assembly from Vellore constituency as an Indian National Congress candidate in 1991 and 2006 elections and as a Tamil Maanila Congress (Moopanar) candidate in 1996, and 2001 elections.

In July 2016, Gnanasekharan joined the All India Anna Dravida Munnetra Kazhagam (AIADMK).

In July 2019, Gnanasekharan joined the Dravida Munnetra Kazhagam (DMK). His father-in-law (Late) Mullai P.Vadivel of DMK, was MLA of Vaniyambadi Constituency, who belongs to illustrious family associated with Justice Party. His daughter-in-law is the daughter of Thiru. M.Thambidurai, Former MP of Karur & Deputy Speaker of Lok Sabha.
