= Gudiyattam taluk =

Gudiyattam taluk is a taluk in Vellore district of the Indian state of Tamil Nadu. The headquarters of the taluk is the town of Gudiyattam. The people of the taluk speak the languages of Tamil and Telugu, Urdu, Malayalam and Kannada. The taluk is represented in parliament by D.Kathir Anand within the Vellore district and Amulu.V in the Legislative Assembly.

== See also ==
- Eriguthi
