= Parthasarathy (disambiguation) =

Parthasarathy is one of the titles and names of Krishna.

Parthasarathy may also refer to:

== People ==
=== First name ===
- Parthasarathy Iyengar (1903–1983), Tamil lawyer and police commissioner
- Parthasarathy (Parthu), Telugu playback singer known as Parthu
- Parthasarathy Ranganathan, American engineer
- Parthasarathy Reddy, Telugu politician
- Parthasarathy Sharma (1948–2010), Indian cricketer
- Kamal Haasan (born Parthasarathy Srinivasan in 1954), Indian actor, filmmaker, screenwriter

=== Surname ===
- Aarthi Parthasarathy, Indian filmmaker and webcomic artist
- Anu Parthasarathy, Indian fashion costume designer, who has worked on Hindi, Tamil and Telugu language films
- Aralumallige Parthasarathy (born 1948), Indian historian
- Avula Parthasarathy (born 1927), Indian philosopher and exponent of Vedanta
- B. Parthasarathy, Tamil politician
- Gopalaswami Parthasarathy (born 1940), Indian diplomat
- Gopalaswami Parthasarathy (diplomat) (1912–1995), Indian diplomat and journalist
- Indira Parthasarathy, Tamil writer and playwright
- K. Parthasarathy (born 1943), Indian cricket umpire
- K. R. Parthasarathy (graph theorist), Indian graph theorist
- K. R. Parthasarathy (probabilist) (1936–2023), Indian probabilist
- Kolusu Parthasarathy (born 1965), Indian politician
- Malini Parthasarathy, Indian journalist
- M. D. Parthasarathy (1910–1963), Indian actor and director
- M.S. Parthasarathy (1924-1981), Indian film editor, director, and producer
- Na. Parthasarathy (1932–1987), Tamil novelist
- R. Parthasarathy (born 1934), Indian poet
- Raghuveer Parthasarathy (born 1976), American biophysicist
- Rajagopalan Parthasarathy, Indian mathematician
- Rajalakshmi Parthasarathy (1925-2019), Indian journalist
- S. Parthasarathy (died 1965), Indian journalist
- S. Parthasarathy Aiyangar (1840-?), Vaishanava scholar and author.
- Sampath Parthasarathy, American food scientist
- Sanjay Parthasarathy, Indian technology executive
- Shobita Parthasarathy, American academic, and author in the field of Science and Technology Studies
- Srilekha Parthasarathy, Tamil singer
- Sriram Parthasarathy, Tamil playback singer
- Subur Parthasarathy (1911-1966), born Subur Mugaseth, Indian educator and legislator
- Thiruvenkatachari Parthasarathy, Indian game theorist
- Swami Parthasarathy (born 1927), Indian philosopher
- Vibha Parthasarathy or Vibha Parthasarathi (born 1940), Indian educational theorist
- Y. G. Parthasarathy (1917–1990), Tamil playwright

== Places ==
- Aranmula Parthasarathy Temple, a temple in Pathanamthitta District, Kerala, India
- Parthasarathy Temple, Mundakkayam, a temple in Kottayam District, Kerala, India
- Parthasarathy Temple, Triplicane, a temple in Chennai, India
- Parthasarathy temple, Parthivapuram, Tamil Nadu
- 27244 Parthasarathy, a minor planet

== Others ==
- Parthasarathy's theorem

== See also ==
- Partha (disambiguation)
- Sarathi (disambiguation)
