= Vyasanakere Prabhanjanacharya =

Indian scholar

Personal life
- Born: 15 June 1946 Vyasanakere, Bellary district, Karnataka
- Region: India
- Main interest(s): Collection, preservation and editing of ancient Sanskrit manuscripts, teaching, spiritual discourses
- Honors: President of All India Philosophical Conference-1994, Bangalore
- Website: www.vyasamadhwa.org

Religious life
- Religion: Hinduism
- Founder of: 1. Sri VyasaMadhva Samshodhana Pratishthana, 2. Sri VyasaMadhva Research Foundation, 3. Govardhana Pratishthana, 4. Sri Raghavendra Vedanta Pathashala, 5. Sri Jayateertha Sanskrit Manuscripts Library, 6. Aitareya Prakashana
- Philosophy: Dvaita Vedanta, Vaishnavism
- Profession: Professor of Sanskrit in various Colleges; retired as the Principal of Govt. First Grade College, KR Puram, Bangalore

Religious career
- Awards: President's Award of Certificate of Honour (2005), Rajyotsava Award (2002), Vidyavachaspati, Jnanaratnakara, Vidyamanya Mahaprashasti, Shastra Pravachana Kesari, Pandita Ratnam, Jnanaratnakara

Vyasanakere Prabhanjanacharya (IAST: Vyāsana-kere Prabhañjan-ācārya) (born 15 June 1946) is an eminent Indian Sanskrit scholar known for his discourses on Sanatana Dharma. He is an expert in the Dvaita school of philosophy, founded by Sri Madhvacharya. Prabhanjanacharya has written, edited and compiled numerous books on Veda, Upanishads, Ramayana, Mahabharata, Bhagavata etc. in the light of Madhva philosophy.

He has won many titles and awards from Indian and international organizations. He was the chairman of the All India Madhwa Philosophical Conference held in Bangalore in 1994. He was the principal and professor (of Sanskrit) of the Government First Grade College in Bangalore. He opted for voluntary retirement from the job to focus on his spiritual and philosophical pursuits. He founded the Śrī Jayatīrtha Manuscript Library, which focuses on rare and unpublished works in Indian philosophy.

He has also founded the Śrī Vyāsa Madhva Saṁśodhana Pratiṣṭhāna trust, which focuses on enriching Indian culture, tradition and values. The trust, through its publication wing, the Aitareya Prakaashana, publishes numerous works. Prabhanjanacharya has critically edited Sarvamula Granthas - collection of all the works of Sri Madhvacharya, based on a 700-year-old palmleaf manuscript. He has also brought out a series of books called StotraMālikā, which is a wonderful collection of hundreds of rare Stotras and stutis, mainly on the Vaiṣṇava tradition.

Prabhanjanacharya has also edited and published numerous books on the Mahabharata, Bhagavad Gita and the Upanishads. In 2005, he was honoured with the President's award of Certificate of Honour (2005). He is the recipient of several prestigious awards including Rajyotsava Award-2002 (from Govt. of Karnataka), Vidyavachaspati, Jnanaratnakara, Vidyamanya Mahaprashasti and many others for his contribution to the Sanskrit, Indian Philosophy and Dvaita Vedanta.

== Early life ==
Vyasanakere Prabhanjanacharya was born on 15 June 1946 in Vyasanakere, a village in the Bellary district of Karnataka. He obtained B.E. (mechanical) from the Mysore University; B.A. from the Karnataka University; and M.A. (in Sanskrit) from the Bangalore University.

He holds PhD from the Rashtriya Sanskrit Vidyapeetha; and D.Litt. from BHU for his critical edition of Sarvamūla works of Jagadguru Śrī Madhvācārya.

== Sanskrit works (edited/compiled/authored) ==
=== Sanskrit works (edited critically with explanatory notes) ===
1–7) ŚrīMadhvācāryapraṇītāḥ Sarvamūlagranthāḥ [श्रीमध्वाचार्यप्रणीताः सर्वमूलग्रन्थाः] - collective works of ŚrīMadhvācārya based on an ancient manuscript ascribed to ŚrīAkṣobhyatīrtha; published in three scripts - Devanāgari (Year: 1999), Kannaḍa (2002) and Telugu (2003)

- Vol. 1: Gītāprasthānam [गीताप्रस्थानम्]
- Vol. 2: Sūtraprasthānam [सूत्रस्थानम्]
- Vol. 3: Upaniṣatprasthānam [उपनिषत्प्रस्थानम्]
- Vol. 4: Śrutiprasthānam [श्रुतिप्रस्थानम्]
- Vol. 5: Mahābhāratatātparyanirṇayaḥ, Yamakabhārataṃ ca [महाभारततात्पर्यनिर्णयः, यमकभारतं च]
- Vol. 6: Bhāgavatatātparyanirṇayaḥ [भागवततात्पर्यनिर्णयः]
- Vol. 7: Ācāragranthāḥ, Prakaraṇagranthāḥ, Stotragranthāśca [आचारग्रन्थाः, प्रकरणग्रन्थाः, स्तोत्रग्रन्थाश्च]

8) Vedavyākhyānam - 1: Ambhṛṇīsūktam (Vyākhyāpañcakayutam) [वेदव्याख्यानम् - १: अम्भृणीसूक्तम् (व्याख्यापञ्चकयुतम्)], 2022

9) Vedavyākhyānam - 2: Baḷitthāsūktam (Aśṭādaśavyākhyopetam) [वेदव्याख्यानम् - २: बळित्थासूक्तम् (अश्टादशव्याख्योपेतम्)], 2022

10) Vedavyākhyānam - 3: Manyusūktam (Dvādaśavyākhyāsaṃvalitam) [वेदव्याख्यानम् - ३: मन्युसूक्तम् (द्वादशव्याख्यासंवलितम्)], 2022

11) Bhagavadgītāvyākhyānam - Tattvaprakāśikākhyam [भगवद्गीताव्याख्यानम् - तत्त्वप्रकाशिकाख्यम्],2022

12) Viṣṇusahasranāmavyākhyānam - Tattvaprakāśikākhyam [विष्णुसहस्रनामव्याख्यानम् - तत्त्वप्रकाशिकाख्यम्], 2022

13) Mahābhāratatātparyanirṇayavyākhyā - Tattvaprakāśikā [महाभारततात्पर्यनिर्णयव्याख्या - तत्त्वप्रकाशिका], 2022

14) ŚrīPadmanābhatīrthakṛtā Brahmasūtrānuvyākhyānaṭīkā-Sannyāyaratnāvalī [श्रीपद्मनाभतीर्थकृता ब्रह्मसूत्रानुव्याख्यानटीका-सन्न्यायरत्नावली]

15) Daśaprakaraṇāni (ŚrīPadmanābhatīrthakṛtavyākhyāsaṃvalitāni) [दशप्रकरणानि (श्रीपद्मनाभतीर्थकृतव्याख्यासंवलितानि)], 2001

16) ŚrīJayatīrthakṛtā Padyamālā [श्रीजयतीर्थकृता पद्यमाला]

17) ŚrīVādirājatīrthakṛtā Bhāgavatānukramaṇikā [श्रीवादिराजतीर्थकृता भागवतानुक्रमणिका]

18) ŚrīViṣṇutīrthakṛtaḥ Śrīmadbhāgavatadhṛtasāraḥ [श्रीविष्णुतीर्थकृतः श्रीमद्भागवतधृतसारः]

19) Śāntakavikṛtā ŚrīmadBhāgavatasaṅgraharatnamālā [शान्तकविकृता श्रीमद्भागवतसङ्ग्रहरत्नमाला]

20) Śrīmadbhāgavatadaśaślokī [श्रीमद्भागवतदशश्लोकी]

21) Gītābhāṣyabhāvaprakāśikā (ŚrīPadmanābhatīrthakṛtagītābhāṣyaṭīkā) [गीताभाष्यभावप्रकाशिका (श्रीपद्मनाभतीर्थकृतगीताभाष्यटीका)], 2009

22) Gītābhāṣyabhāvaprakāśikā (ŚrīNaraharitīrthakṛtā Gītābhāṣyaṭīkā) [गीताभाष्यभावप्रकाशिका (श्रीनरहरितीर्थकृता गीताभाष्यटीका)], 2009

23) ŚrīRāghavendratīrthakṛtaḥ Gītātātparyanirṇayaṭīkā-Nyāyadīpikābhāvadīpaḥ [श्रीराघवेन्द्रतीर्थकृतः गीतातात्पर्यनिर्णयटीका-न्यायदीपिकाभावदीपः]

24) ŚrīVādirājatīrthakṛtaḥ Bhagavadgītālakṣālaṅkāraḥ [श्रीवादिराजतीर्थकृतः भगवद्गीतालक्षालङ्कारः], 2009

25) Śrīmadbhagavadgītā (ŚrīVidyādhirājatīrtha-ŚrīRāghavendratīrthavyākhyāsaṃvalitā) [श्रीमद्भगवद्गीता (श्रीविद्याधिराजतीर्थ-श्रीराघवेन्द्रतीर्थव्याख्यासंवलिता)], 2006

26) ŚrīSatyadharmatīrthakṛtaḥ Gītāmāhātmyasārasaṅgrahaḥ [श्रीसत्यधर्मतीर्थकृतः गीतामाहात्म्यसारसङ्ग्रहः]

27) ŚrīViṣṇutīrthakṛtaḥ Gītāsāroddhāraḥ [श्रीविष्णुतीर्थकृतः गीतासारोद्धारः]

28) VālmīkiRāmāyaṇam (ŚrīSatyaparāyaṇatīrthakṛtavyākhyānasametam) [वाल्मीकिरामायणम् (श्रीसत्यपरायणतीर्थकृतव्याख्यानसमेतम्)], 2017

29) Nārāyaṇapaṇḍitācāryakṛta Saṅgraharāmāyaṇam [नारायणपण्डिताचार्यकृत सङ्ग्रहरामायणम्], 2011

30) ŚrīRājarājeśvaratīrthakṛtaḥ Rāmasandeśaḥ (ŚrīViśvapatitīrthakṛtavyākhyānasahitaḥ) [श्रीराजराजेश्वरतीर्थकृतः रामसन्देशः (श्रीविश्वपतितीर्थकृतव्याख्यानसहितः)], 2019

31) Mahābhārata-Virāṭaparvan (ŚrīSatyadharmatīrthakṛtavyākhyāsametam) [महाभारतविराटपर्व (श्रीसत्यधर्मतीर्थकृतव्याख्यासमेतम्)], 2018

32) Mahābhārata-Virāṭaparvan (LiṅgeriŚrīnivāsācāryakṛtavyākhyāsametam) [महाभारतविराटपर्व (लिङ्गेरिश्रीनिवासाचार्यकृतव्याख्यासमेतम्)], 2019

33) Yakṣapraśnaḥ (Śrīnivāsācāryakṛtavyākhyānasametaḥ) [यक्षप्रश्नः (श्रीनिवासाचार्यकृतव्याख्यानसमेतः)], 2020

34) Mahābhāratasārasaṅgrahaḥ [महाभारतसारसङ्ग्रहः]

35) Śāntakavikṛta Mahābhāratakathāsaṅgraharatnamālikā [शान्तकविकृत महाभारतकथासङ्ग्रहरत्नमालिका]

36) Sāvitryupākhyānam [सावित्र्युपाख्यानम्]

37) Mahābhāratatātparyanirṇayaḥ (ŚrīVādirājatīrthakṛtavyākhyānasametaḥ) [महाभारततात्पर्यनिर्णयः (श्रीवादिराजतीर्थकृतव्याख्यानसमेतः)], 1998

38) Nārāyaṇapaṇḍitācāryakṛtaḥ Aṃśāvatāraḥ [नारायणपण्डिताचार्यकृतः अंशावतारः], 1996

39) Aitareyopaniṣadbhāṣyam (Śrīviśveśavaratīrthaviracitaṭīkāsametam) [ऐतरेयोपनिषद्भाष्यम् (श्रीविश्वेशवरतीर्थविरचितटीकासमेतम्)], 1998

40) Īśāvāsyopaniṣadbhāṣyam (Śrīvyāsatīrthakṛtavyākhyāsametam) [ईशावास्योपनिषद्भाष्यम् (श्रीव्यासतीर्थकृतव्याख्यासमेतम्)], 2010

41) ŚrīVādirājatīrthakṛtaṃ Ambhṛṇīsūktavyākhyānam [श्रीवादिराजतीर्थकृतं अम्भृणीसूक्तव्याख्यानम्]

42) ŚrīRāghavendratīrthakṛtaḥ Aitareyopaniṣanmantrārthasaṅgrahaḥ [श्रीराघवेन्द्रतीर्थकृतः ऐतरेयोपनिषन्मन्त्रार्थसङ्ग्रहः]

43) ŚrīRāghavendratīrthakṛtaṃ Ambhṛṇīsūktavyākhyānam [श्रीराघवेन्द्रतीर्थकृतं अम्भृणीसूक्तव्याख्यानम्]

44) Tantrasārasaṅgrahaḥ (ChalāriŚeṣācāryakṛtavyākhyānasahitaḥ) [तन्त्रसारसङ्ग्रहः (छलारिशेषाचार्यकृतव्याख्यानसहितः)], 1993

45) ŚrīRāghavendratīrthakṛtaḥ Tantrasāramantrodddhāraḥ [श्रीराघवेन्द्रतीर्थकृतः तन्त्रसारमन्त्रोद्द्धारः], 1998

46) Sumatīndratīrthakṛta Mantraratnakośaḥ [सुमतीन्द्रतीर्थकृत मन्त्ररत्नकोशः], 2006

47) Yatipraṇavakalpaḥ (Vyāsarāmācāryakṛtavyākhyānasahitaḥ) [यतिप्रणवकल्पः (व्यासरामाचार्यकृतव्याख्यानसहितः)], 2010

48) Raṅgapatibhikṣukṛtā Sannyāsapaddhatiḥ [रङ्गपतिभिक्षुकृता सन्न्यासपद्धतिः], 2016

49) ŚrīVādirājatīrthakṛtaḥ Pūjākalpaḥ [श्रीवादिराजतीर्थकृतः पूजाकल्पः], 2010

50) Āhnikapaddhatiḥ [आह्निकपद्धतिः], 2020

51) ŚrīPāṅghriŚrīnivāsācāryakṛtaḥ Naivedya-Vaiśvadevanirṇayaḥ [श्रीपाङ्घ्रिश्रीनिवासाचार्यकृतः नैवेद्य-वैश्वदेवनिर्णयः]

52) ŚrīŚrīnivāsācāryakṛtiratnamālā [श्रीश्रीनिवासाचार्यकृतिरत्नमाला], 2018

53) ŚrīSatyanāthatīrthakṛtā Vijayamālā [श्रीसत्यनाथतीर्थकृता विजयमाला], 1993

54) ŚrīMadhvācāryakṛtā ŚrīNṛsiṃhanakhastutiḥ (Vyākhyāṣaṭkopetā) [श्रीमध्वाचार्यकृता श्रीनृसिंहनखस्तुतिः (व्याख्याषट्कोपेता)], 2020

55) Nārāyaṇapaṇḍitācāryakṛtaḥ Sumadhvavijayaḥ [नारायणपण्डिताचार्यकृतः सुमध्वविजयः], 1989

56) Nārāyaṇapaṇḍitācāryakṛtaḥ Sumadhvavijayaḥ (Bhāvaprakāśikāsametaḥ) [नारायणपण्डिताचार्यकृतः सुमध्वविजयः (भावप्रकाशिकासमेतः)], 1989

57) ŚrīVādirājatīrthakṛtaḥ Rugmiṇīśavijayaḥ (Mūlamātram) [श्रीवादिराजतीर्थकृतः रुग्मिणीशविजयः (मूलमात्रम्)],

58) ŚrīVādirājatīrthakṛtaḥ Rugmiṇīśavijayaḥ (Nārāyaṇācāryakṛtavyākhyāsaṃvalitaḥ) [श्रीवादिराजतीर्थकृतः रुग्मिणीशविजयः (नारायणाचार्यकृतव्याख्यासंवलितः)], 1996 and 2015

59) ŚrīJayatīrthavijayaḥ (ŚrīSaṅkarṣaṇācāryakṛtavyākhyānasametaḥ) [श्रीजयतीर्थविजयः (श्रीसङ्कर्षणाचार्यकृतव्याख्यानसमेतः)], 1994

60) ŚrīVādirājatīrthakṛtaḥ Tīrthaprabandhaḥ (Mūlamātram) [श्रीवादिराजतीर्थकृतः तीर्थप्रबन्धः (मूलमात्रम्)]

61) ŚrīVādirājatīrthakṛtaḥ Tīrthaprabandhaḥ (Nārāyaṇācāryakṛtavyākhyāsaṃvalitaḥ) [श्रीवादिराजतीर्थकृतः तीर्थप्रबन्धः (नारायणाचार्यकृतव्याख्यासंवलितः)], 1991

62) ŚrīVādirājatīrthakṛtaḥ Sarasabhāratīvilāsaḥ [श्रीवादिराजतीर्थकृतः सरसभारतीविलासः], 1989

63) ŚrīSatyābhinavatīrthakṛtaḥ Rāmāmṛtamahārṇavaḥ [श्रीसत्याभिनवतीर्थकृतः रामामृतमहार्णवः], 2009

64) ŚrīSatyadharmatīrthakṛtā Virahimodasudhā (savyākhyā) [श्रीसत्यधर्मतीर्थकृता विरहिमोदसुधा (सव्याख्या)]

65) ŚrīSatyadharmatīrthakṛtaḥ Kavikaṇṭhamaṇiḥ (savyākhyaḥ) [श्रीसत्यधर्मतीर्थकृतः कविकण्ठमणिः (सव्याख्यः)]

66) ŚrīSatyadharmatīrthakṛtā Gaṅgālaharī (savyākhyā) [श्रीसत्यधर्मतीर्थकृता गङ्गालहरी (सव्याख्या)]

67) ŚrīSatyadharmatīrthakṛtā Yaduvaracaritāmṛtalaharī (savyākhyā) [श्रीसत्यधर्मतीर्थकृता यदुवरचरितामृतलहरी (सव्याख्या)]

68) Śrīmadhvācāryakṛtaḥ Bilvalaṅgalaḥ sādhuḥ (ŚrīVijñānatīrthakṛtavyākhyāsametaḥ) [श्रीमध्वाचार्यकृतः बिल्वमङ्गलः साधुः (श्रीविज्ञानतीर्थकृतव्याख्यासमेतः)], 2014

69) Śrīmadhvācāryakṛtaḥ Bilvalaṅgalaḥ sādhuḥ (ŚrīSatyaparāyaṇatīrthakṛtavyākhyāsametaḥ) [श्रीमध्वाचार्यकृतः बिल्वमङ्गलः साधुः (श्रीसत्यपरायणतीर्थकृतव्याख्यासमेतः)], 2014

70) ŚrīKṛṣṇajayantīnirṇayaḥ (ŚrīRāmacandratīrthakṛtavyākhyāsametaḥ) [श्रीकृष्णजयन्तीनिर्णयः (श्रीरामचन्द्रतीर्थकृतव्याख्यासमेतः)], 2014

71) Śrīkṛṣṇajayantīnirṇayaḥ (ŚrīSatyaparāyaṇatīrthakṛtavyākhyāsametaḥ) [श्रीकृष्णजयन्तीनिर्णयः (श्रीसत्यपरायणतीर्थकृतव्याख्यासमेतः)], 2014

72) Brahmasūtravaibhavam [ब्रह्मसूत्रवैभवम्], 1991

73) ŚrīPūrṇaprajñavaibhavam [श्रीपूर्णप्रज्ञवैभवम्], 1992

74) Tāmraparṇīānandatīrthācāryakṛtā Tattvasārasamuddhṛtiḥ [ताम्रपर्णी आनन्दतीर्थाचार्यकृता तत्त्वसारसमुद्धृतिः], 2015

75) Viṣṇucandrikā [विष्णुचन्द्रिका], 2014

=== Compendium of stotras (स्तोत्रसङ्ग्रहः) ===
76–87) Stotramālikā (in 12 volumes) [स्तोत्रमालिका (१२ सम्पुटेषु)]

- Vol. 1: Nityapaṭhanīyavaiṣṇavastotrāṇi [नित्यपठनीयवैष्णवस्तोत्राणि], 1994
- Vol. 2: Keśavādibhagavadrūpastotramālikā [केशवादिभगवद्रूपस्तोत्रमालिका], 2016
- Vol. 3: Daśāvatārastotramālikā [दशावतारस्तोत्रमालिका], 2016
- Vol. 4: Saṅkīrṇastotramālikā (bhāgaḥ - 1) [सङ्कीर्णस्तोत्रमालिका (भागः - १)], 2016
- Vol. 5: Saṅkīrṇastotramālikā (bhāgaḥ - 2) [सङ्कीर्णस्तोत्रमालिका (भागः - २)], 2017
- Vol. 6: Sahasranāmastotramālikā [सहस्रनामस्तोत्रमालिका], 2016
- Vol. 7: Lakṣmīstotramālikā [लक्ष्मीस्तोत्रमालिका], 2010
- Vol. 8: Vāyustotramālikā [वायुस्तोत्रमालिका], 2017
- Vol. 9: Tāratamyastotramālikā [तारतम्यस्तोत्रमालिका], 2017
- Vol. 10: Devatāstotramālikā [देवतास्तोत्रमालिका], 2019
- Vol. 11: Paurāṇikastotramālikā [पौराणिकस्तोत्रमालिका], 2019
- Vol. 12: Gurustotramālikā [गुरुस्तोत्रमालिका], 2019

88) ŚrīManmadhvācāryakṛtaṃ Dvādaśastotram (Vyākhyādvayasaṃvalitam) [श्रीमन्मध्वाचार्यकृतं द्वादशस्तोत्रम् (व्याख्याद्वयसंवलितम्)], 2003

89) Stutimañjarī [स्तुतिमञ्जरी], 2013

90) Stotramālā [स्तोत्रमाला], 1986

91) ŚrīRāmasotramañjarī [श्रीरामस्तोत्रमञ्जरी], 1981

92) ŚrīJayatīrthastotramañjarī [श्रीजयतीर्थस्तोत्रमञ्जरी], 1988

93) ŚrīVādirājastotramañjarī [श्रीवादिराजस्तोत्रमञ्जरी], 1980

94) ŚrīJayatīrthaślokamālā-ŚrīJayatīrthastotramañjarī [श्रीजयतीर्थश्लोकमाला-श्रीजयतीर्थस्तोत्रमञ्जरी], 1981

95) Daśāvatārastutiḥ [दशावतारस्तुतिः], 1973

96) Śivastutiḥ [शिवस्तुतिः], 1973

97) Subhāṣitāni [सुभाषितानि्], 1973

98) Navaratnastotramañjarī [नवरत्नस्तोत्रमञ्जरी], 1998

99) Sarvamūla-ādyantaślokāḥ [सर्वमूल-आद्यन्दश्लोकाः], 2000

100) Bhramaragītā (ŚrībidarahaḷḷiŚrenivāsatīrthakṛtavyākhyāsametā) [भ्रमरगीता (श्रीबिदरहळ्ळिश्रीनिवासतीर्थकृतव्याख्यासमेता) ], 2019

101) Śrutigītā (ŚrīBidarahaḷḷiŚrenivāsatīrthakṛtavyākhyāsametā) [श्रुतिगीता (श्रीबिदरहळ्ळिश्रीनिवासतीर्थकृतव्याख्यासमेता)], 2019

102) ŚrīRāghavendrastotramālikā [श्रीराघवेन्द्रस्तोत्रमालिका]

103) ŚrīYadupatyācāryakṛtaṃ ŚrīVedavyāsagadyam (Vyākhyānadvayopetam) [श्रीयदुपत्याचार्यकृतं श्रीवेदव्यासगद्यम् (व्याख्यानद्वयोपेतम्)], 2020

104) ŚrīYadupatyācāryakṛtaṃ ŚrīVedavyāsakarāvalambanastotram (Vyākhyānasametam) [श्रीयदुपत्याचार्यकृतं श्रीवेदव्यासकरावलम्बनस्तोत्रम् (व्याख्यानसमेतम्)], 2019

== Kannada works (edited/compiled/translated/authored) ==
=== Edited works [ಸಂಶೋಧಿತ ಕೃತಿಗಳು] ===
1–7) ŚrīMadhvācāryapraṇīta Sarvamūlagranthagaḷu, [ಶ್ರೀಮಧ್ವಾಚಾರ್ಯಪ್ರಣೀತ ಸರ್ವಮೂಲಗ್ರಂಥಗಳು], 2012

- Vol. 1: Gītāprasthāna [ಸಂಪುಟ-೧: ಗೀತಾಪ್ರಸ್ಥಾನ]
- Vol. 2: Sūtraprasthāna [ಸಂಪುಟ-೨: ಸೂತ್ರಪ್ರಸ್ಥಾನ]
- Vol. 3: Upaniṣatprasthāna [ಸಂಪುಟ-೩: ಉಪನಿಷತ್ಪ್ರಸ್ಥಾನ]
- Vol. 4: Śrutiprasthāna, saṅkīrṇaprasthāna [ಸಂಪುಟ-೪: ಶ್ರುತಿಪ್ರಸ್ಥಾನ, ಸಂಕೀರ್ಣಪ್ರಸ್ಥಾನ]
- Vol. 5: Itihāsaprasthāna [ಸಂಪುಟ-೫: ಇತಿಹಾಸಪ್ರಸ್ಥಾನ]
- Vol. 6: Śrīmadbhāgavatatātparyanirṇaya [ಸಂಪುಟ-೬: ಶ್ರೀಮದ್ಭಾಗವತತಾತ್ಪರ್ಯನಿರ್ಣಯ]

8–19) Stotramālikā (12 sampuṭagaḷalli) [ಸ್ತೋತ್ರಮಾಲಿಕಾ (೧೨ ಸಂಪುಟಗಳಲ್ಲಿ)]

- Vol. 1: Nityapaṭhanīyavaiṣṇavastotramālikā [ಭಾಗ-೧: ನಿತ್ಯಪಠನೀಯವೈಷ್ಣವಸ್ತೋತ್ರಮಾಲಿಕಾ]
- Vol. 2: Viṣṇustotramālikā [ಭಾಗ-೨: ವಿಷ್ಣುಸ್ತೋತ್ರಮಾಲಿಕಾ]
- Vol. 3: Daśāvatārastotramālikā [ಭಾಗ-೩: ದಶಾವತಾರಸ್ತೋತ್ರಮಾಲಿಕಾ]
- Vol. 4: Saṅkīrṇaviṣṇustotramālikā-1 [ಭಾಗ-೪: ಸಂಕೀರ್ಣವಿಷ್ಣುಸ್ತೋತ್ರಮಾಲಿಕಾ-೧]
- Vol. 5: Saṅkīrṇaviṣṇustotramālikā-2 [ಭಾಗ-೫: ಸಂಕೀರ್ಣವಿಷ್ಣುಸ್ತೋತ್ರಮಾಲಿಕಾ-೨]
- Vol. 6: Sahasranāmastotramālikā [ಭಾಗ-೬: ಸಹಸ್ರನಾಮಸ್ತೋತ್ರಮಾಲಿಕಾ]
- Vol. 7: Lakṣmīstotramālikā [ಭಾಗ-೭: ಲಕ್ಷ್ಮೀಸ್ತೋತ್ರಮಾಲಿಕಾ]
- Vol. 8: Vāyustotramālikā [ಭಾಗ-೮: ವಾಯುಸ್ತೋತ್ರಮಾಲಿಕಾ]
- Vol. 9: Tāratamyastotramālikā [ಭಾಗ-೯: ತಾರತಮ್ಯಸ್ತೋತ್ರಮಾಲಿಕಾ]
- Vol. 10: Devatāstotramālikā [ಭಾಗ-೧೦: ದೇವತಾಸ್ತೋತ್ರಮಾಲಿಕಾ]
- Vol. 11: Paurāṇikastotramālikā [ಭಾಗ-೧೧: ಪೌರಾಣಿಕಸ್ತೋತ್ರಮಾಲಿಕಾ]
- Vol. 12: Gurustotramālikā [ಭಾಗ-೧೨: ಗುರುಸ್ತೋತ್ರಮಾಲಿಕಾ]

=== Works related to Haridāsasāhitya [ಹರಿದಾಸಸಾಹಿತ್ಯದ ಕೃತಿಗಳು] ===
20) Kanakadāsakṛta Haribhaktisāra [ಕನಕದಾಸಕೃತ ಹರಿಭಕ್ತಿಸಾರ]

21) Kanakadāsara Samagra Kīrtanegaḷu [ಕನಕದಾಸರ ಸಮಗ್ರ ಕೀರ್ತನೆಗಳು]

22) Santa-kavi-bhakta Śrīkanakadāsaru [ಸಂತ-ಕವಿ-ಭಕ್ತ ಶ್ರೀಕನಕದಾಸರು]

23) Śrīkanakadāsara Nuḍimuttugaḷu [ಶ್ರೀಕನಕದಾಸರ ನುಡಿಮುತ್ತುಗಳು]

24) Guru-varada-tande gopāladāsara Kṛtigaḷu [ಗುರು-ವರದ-ತಂದೆ ಗೋಪಾಲದಾಸರ ಕೃತಿಗಳು]

25) Śrīvijayadāsadarśana [ಶ್ರೀವಿಜಯದಾಸದರ್ಶನ]

26) Harikathāmṛtasāra (Mūla, Saṃśodhita āvṛtti) [ಹರಿಕಥಾಮೃತಸಾರ (ಮೂಲ, ಸಂಶೋಧಿತ ಆವೃತ್ತಿ)]

27) Harikathāmṛtasāra (anuvāda-vivaraṇe sahita) [ಹರಿಕಥಾಮೃತಸಾರ (ಅನುವಾದ-ವಿವರಣೆ ಸಹಿತ)]

28) Harikathāmṛtasāra (with the commentary of Kamalāpatidāsa) [ಹರಿಕಥಾಮೃತಸಾರ (ಕಮಲಾಪತಿದಾಸಕೃತವ್ಯಾಖ್ಯಾನಸಮೇತ)]

29) Harikathāmṛtasāra (with the commentary of Guruyogidhyeyaviṭhaladāsa) [ಹರಿಕಥಾಮೃತಸಾರ (ಗುರುಯೋಗಿಧ್ಯೇಯವಿಠಲದಾಸಕೃತವ್ಯಾಖ್ಯಾನಸಮೇತ)]

30) ŚrīKamalāpatidāsakṛta Sāragamanikāmañjūṣā [ಶ್ರೀಕಮಲಾಪತಿದಾಸಕೃತ ಸಾರಗಮನಿಕಾಮಂಜೂಷಾ]

31) Jagannāthadāsakṛta Tattvasuvvāli [ಜಗನ್ನಾಥದಾಸಕೃತ ತತ್ತ್ವಸುವ್ವಾಲಿ]

32) ŚrīPurandaradāsara Āyda Kṛtigaḷu [ಶ್ರೀಪುರಂದರದಾಸರ ಆಯ್ದ ಕೃತಿಗಳು]

33) ŚrīHaribhajanakalpadruma [ಶ್ರೀಹರಿಭಜನಕಲ್ಪದ್ರುಮ]

34) ŚrīHarigurubhajanāmṛta [ಶ್ರೀಹರಿಗುರುಭಜನಾಮೃತ ]

35) Haridāsara Ugābhogagaḷu [ಹರಿದಾಸರ ಉಗಾಭೋಗಗಳು]

36) Haridāsakṛtimañjarī [ಹರಿದಾಸಕೃತಿಮಂಜರೀ]

37) Bhajanamañjarī [ಭಜನಮಂಜರೀ]

38) Lakṣmībhajanāmṛta [ಲಕ್ಷ್ಮೀಭಜನಾಮೃತ]

39) ŚrīAnantādrīśakṛta Veṅkaṭeśapārijāta [ಶ್ರೀಅನಂತಾದ್ರೀಶಕೃತ ವೆಂಕಟೇಶಪಾರಿಜಾತ]

40) Śrīmadhvapativiṭhaladāsaru [ಶ್ರೀಮಧ್ವಪತಿವಿಠಲದಾಸರು]

=== Biographical works [ಚರಿತ್ರಗ್ರಂಥಗಳು] ===
41) ŚrīVedavyāsadarśana [ಶ್ರೀವೇದವ್ಯಾಸದರ್ಶನ]

42) ŚrīPūrṇaprajñadarśana [ಶ್ರೀಪೂರ್ಣಪ್ರಜ್ಞದರ್ಶನ]

43) ŚrīPūrṇaprajñadarśana (Saṅkṣipta) [ಶ್ರೀಪೂರ್ಣಪ್ರಜ್ಞದರ್ಶನ (ಸಂಕ್ಷಿಪ್ತ)]

44) ŚrīJayatīrthadarśana [ಶ್ರೀಜಯತೀರ್ಥದರ್ಶನ]

45) ŚrīBrahmaṇyatīrtharu [ಶ್ರೀಬ್ರಹ್ಮಣ್ಯತೀರ್ಥರು]

46) ŚrīVyāsarājadarśana [ಶ್ರೀವ್ಯಾಸರಾಜದರ್ಶನ]

47) ŚrīVijayīndradarśana [ಶ್ರೀವಿಜಯೀಂದ್ರದರ್ಶನ]

48) ŚrīRaghūttamatīrtharu [ಶ್ರೀರಘೂತ್ತಮತೀರ್ಥರು]

49) ŚrīVedeśatīrtharu hāgū avara Śiṣya-praśiṣyaru [ಶ್ರೀವೇದೇಶತೀರ್ಥರು ಹಾಗೂ ಅವರ ಶಿಷ್ಯ-ಪ್ರಶಿಷ್ಯರು]

50) Kambālūru Śrīrāmacandratīrtharu [ಕಂಬಾಲೂರು ಶ್ರೀರಾಮಚಂದ್ರತೀರ್ಥರು]

51) ŚrīRāghavendradarśana [ಶ್ರೀರಾಘವೇಂದ್ರದರ್ಶನ]

52) ŚrīRāghavendrakṛtimañjarī [ಶ್ರೀರಾಘವೇಂದ್ರಕೃತಿಮಂಜರೀ]

53) ŚrīRāghavendradarśana (saṅkṣipta) [ಶ್ರೀರಾಘವೇಂದ್ರದರ್ಶನ (ಸಂಕ್ಷಿಪ್ತ)]

54) ŚrīYādavāryakṛtimañjarī [ಶ್ರೀಯಾದವಾರ್ಯಕೃತಿಮಂಜರೀ]

55) ŚrīŚrīnivāsatīrthakṛtimañjarī [ಶ್ರೀಶ್ರೀನಿವಾಸತೀರ್ಥಕೃತಿಮಂಜರೀ]

56) ŚrīSatyadharmatīrthakṛtimañjarī [ಶ್ರೀಸತ್ಯಧರ್ಮತೀರ್ಥಕೃತಿಮಂಜರೀ]

57) ŚrīViṣṇutīrthakṛtimañjarī [ಶ್ರೀವಿಷ್ಣುತೀರ್ಥಕೃತಿಮಂಜರೀ]

58) Uḍupi Aṣṭamaṭhagaḷa Guruparampare [ಉಡುಪಿ ಅಷ್ಟಮಠಗಳ ಗುರುಪರಂಪರೆ]

=== Translated works [ಅನುವಾದಿತ ಕೃತಿಗಳು] ===
59) Mahābhāratatātparyanirṇaya (in 5 volumes) [ಮಹಾಭಾರತತಾತ್ಪರ್ಯನಿರ್ಣಯ (೫ ಸಂಪುಟಗಳಲ್ಲಿ)]

60) ŚrīNārāyaṇapaṇḍitācāryakṛta saṅgraharāmāyaṇa [ಶ್ರೀನಾರಾಯಣಪಂಡಿತಾಚಾರ್ಯಕೃತ ಸಂಗ್ರಹರಾಮಾಯಣ]

61) ŚrīVādirājatīrthakṛta rugmiṇīśavijaya [ಶ್ರೀವಾದಿರಾಜತೀರ್ಥಕೃತ ರುಗ್ಮಿಣೀಶವಿಜಯ]

62) ŚrīNārāyaṇapaṇḍitācāryakṛta sumadhvavijaya [ಶ್ರೀನಾರಾಯಣಪಂಡಿತಾಚಾರ್ಯಕೃತ ಸುಮಧ್ವವಿಜಯ]

63) ŚrīMadhvācāryakṛta sundarakāṇḍanirṇaya [ಶ್ರೀಮಧ್ವಾಚಾರ್ಯಕೃತ ಸುಂದರಕಾಂಡನಿರ್ಣಯ]

64) ŚrīMadhvācāryakṛta kṛṣṇāmṛtamahārṇava [ಶ್ರೀಮಧ್ವಾಚಾರ್ಯಕೃತ ಕೃಷ್ಣಾಮೃತಮಹಾರ್ಣವ]

65) ŚrīJayatīrthakṛta padyamālā [ಶ್ರೀಜಯತೀರ್ಥಕೃತ ಪದ್ಯಮಾಲಾ]

66) Bhagavadgītā [ಭಗವದ್ಗೀತಾ]

67) ŚrīTrivikramapaṇḍitācāryakṛta harivāyustuti [ಶ್ರೀತ್ರಿವಿಕ್ರಮಪಂಡಿತಾಚಾರ್ಯಕೃತ ಹರಿವಾಯುಸ್ತುತಿ]

68) Madhvāmṛtamahārṇava [ಮಧ್ವಾಮೃತಮಹಾರ್ಣವ]

69) Ambhṛṇīsūkta (śrīvādirājatīrthakṛta vyākhyānasamEta) [ಅಂಭೃಣೀಸೂಕ್ತ (ಶ್ರೀವಾದಿರಾಜತೀರ್ಥಕೃತ ವ್ಯಾಖ್ಯಾನಸಮೇತ)]

70) Ambhṛṇīsūkta (śrīrāghavEndratīrthara vyākhyānasamEta) [ಅಂಭೃಣೀಸೂಕ್ತ (ಶ್ರೀರಾಘವೇಂದ್ರತೀರ್ಥರ ವ್ಯಾಖ್ಯಾನಸಮೇತ)]

71) Baḷitthāsūkta [ಬಳಿತ್ಥಾಸೂಕ್ತ]

72) ŚrīVādirājatīrthakṛta Tīrthaprabandha [ಶ್ರೀವಾದಿರಾಜತೀರ್ಥಕೃತ ತೀರ್ಥಪ್ರಬಂಧ]

73) Nārāyaṇapaṇḍitācāryakṛta aṃśāvatāra [ನಾರಾಯಣಪಂಡಿತಾಚಾರ್ಯಕೃತ ಅಂಶಾವತಾರ]

74) ŚrīRājarājeśvaratīrthakṛta maṅgaḷāṣṭaka [ಶ್ರೀರಾಜರಾಜೇಶ್ವರತೀರ್ಥಕೃತ ಮಂಗಳಾಷ್ಟಕ]

75) ŚrīAppaṇṇācāryakṛta śrīrāghavEndrastOtra [ಶ್ರೀಅಪ್ಪಣ್ಣಾಚಾರ್ಯಕೃತ ಶ್ರೀರಾಘವೇಂದ್ರಸ್ತೋತ್ರ]

76) Manusubhāṣita [ಮನುಸುಭಾಷಿತ]

77) Viduranīti [ವಿದುರನೀತಿ]

78) Saṃskṛtasūktimañjarī (subhāṣitagaḷa saṅgraha-anuvāda) [ಸಂಸ್ಕೃತಸೂಕ್ತಿಮಂಜರೀ (ಸುಭಾಷಿತಗಳ ಸಂಗ್ರಹ-ಅನುವಾದ)]

79) Rāmāmṛtamahārṇava [ರಾಮಾಮೃತಮಹಾರ್ಣವ]

80) Pavitrapājaka [ಪವಿತ್ರಪಾಜಕ]

81) Dvādaśastotra - Anuvāda, Vivaraṇe [ದ್ವಾದಶಸ್ತೊತ್ರ - ಅನುವಾದ, ವಿವರಣೆ], 2022

82) Dvādaśastotra - Padyānuvāda [ದ್ವಾದಶಸ್ತೊತ್ರ - ಪದ್ಯಾನುವಾದ], 2022

=== Compiled works [ಸಂಗ್ರಹಕೃತಿಗಳು] ===
83) Śrīvādirājatīrthakṛta Rugmiṇīśavijaya (mūla) [ಶ್ರೀವಾದಿರಾಜತೀರ್ಥಕೃತ ರುಗ್ಮಿಣೀಶವಿಜಯ (ಮೂಲ)]

84) Śrīnārāyaṇapaṇḍitācāryakṛta Sumadhvavijaya (mūla) [ಶ್ರೀನಾರಾಯಣಪಂಡಿತಾಚಾರ್ಯಕೃತ ಸುಮಧ್ವವಿಜಯ (ಮೂಲ)]

85) Śrījayatīrthaślokamālā, Padyamālā [ಶ್ರೀಜಯತೀರ್ಥಶ್ಲೊಕಮಾಲಾ, ಪದ್ಯಮಾಲಾ]

86) Brahmasūtranāmāvali [ಬ್ರಹ್ಮಸೂತ್ರನಾಮಾವಲಿ]

=== Independent works [ಸ್ವತಂತ್ರಕೃತಿಗಳು] ===
87) Rāmakathāmṛta [ರಾಮಕಥಾಮೃತ], 2022

88) Madhvabhārata [ಮಧ್ವಭಾರತ]

89) Madhvasiddhānta [ಮಧ್ವಸಿದ್ಧಾಂತ]

90) Madhvasiddhāntasaurabha [ಮಧ್ವಸಿದ್ಧಾಂತಸೌರಭ]

91) Sarvamūlasaurabha [ಸರ್ವಮೂಲಸೌರಭ]

92) Sarvamūla-Sudhā [ಸರ್ವಮೂಲ-ಸುಧಾ]

93) Pravacanavinoda [ಪ್ರವಚನವಿನೋದ]

94) Pravacanabhāratī [ಪ್ರವಚನಭಾರತೀ]

95) Mahābhāratada Beḷaku [ಮಹಾಭಾರತದ ಬೆಳಕು]

96) Bhāgavatada Beḷaku [ಭಾಗವತದ ಬೆಳಕು]

97) Dvaitavāṅmayakke ŚrīRāghavendramaṭhada Koḍuge [ದ್ವೈತವಾಙ್ಮಯಕ್ಕೆ ಶ್ರೀರಾಘವೇಂದ್ರಮಠದ ಕೊಡುಗೆ ]

98) Gītāmāhātmya [ಗೀತಾಮಾಹಾತ್ಮ್ಯ]

99) Draupadī-Vidura [ದ್ರೌಪದೀ-ವಿದುರ]

100) Dvārakāmāhātmya [ದ್ವಾರಕಾಮಾಹಾತ್ಮ್ಯ]

101) Gītāmadhu [ಗೀತಾಮಧು]

102) Gītādarśana [ಗೀತಾದರ್ಶನ]

103) Śrīpūrṇaprajñavaibhava [ಶ್ರೀಪೂರ್ಣಪ್ರಜ್ಞವೈಭವ]

104) Madhvasiddhānta mattu ŚrīRāghavEndrasvāmigaḷa sandeśa [ಮಧ್ವಸಿದ್ಧಾಂತ ಮತ್ತು ಶ್ರೀರಾಘವೇಂದ್ರಸ್ವಾಮಿಗಳ ಸಂದೇಶ]

105) Vyāsabhāratada Bhīmasena [ವ್ಯಾಸಭಾರತದ ಭೀಮಸೇನ]

106) Vivāhacandrikā [ವಿವಾಹಚಂದ್ರಿಕಾ]

107) Kurukṣetra [ಕುರುಕ್ಷೇತ್ರ]

108) Parimaḷa [ಪರಿಮಳ]

109) Pavitratuḷasi [ಪವಿತ್ರತುಳಸಿ]

110) MadhvaśāstravinOda [ಮಧ್ವಶಾಸ್ತ್ರವಿನೋದ]

=== Critical reviews [ವಿಮರ್ಶಾತ್ಮಕಕೃತಿಗಳು] ===
111) Pañcakanyeyaru [ಪಂಚಕನ್ಯೆಯರು ]

112) Śrībhāratāmṛta [ಶ್ರೀಭಾರತಾಮೃತ]

113) Pūrṇaprajñapraśasti [ಪೂರ್ಣಪ್ರಜ್ಞಪ್ರಶಸ್ತಿ]

114) Śrīmadhvācāryara kālanirṇaya [ಶ್ರೀಮಧ್ವಾಚಾರ್ಯರ ಕಾಲನಿರ್ಣಯ]

115) Śrījayatīrthara Mūlavṛndāvanasthaḷa [ಶ್ರೀಜಯತೀರ್ಥರ ಮೂಲವೃಂದಾವನಸ್ಥಳ]

116) Ṣaḍdarśanasaṅgraha [ಷಡ್ದರ್ಶನಸಂಗ್ರಹ]

117) Dvaitavāṅmaya [ದ್ವೈತವಾಙ್ಮಯ]

118) Dvaitavāṅmayataraṅga [ದ್ವೈತವಾಙ್ಮಯತರಂಗ]

119) Vedaśāstravinoda [ವೇದಶಾಸ್ತ್ರವಿನೋದ]

120) Ādyaśaṅkarācāryaru [ಆದ್ಯಶಂಕರಾಚಾರ್ಯರು, ೧೯೬೮], 1968

121) Vaidikasaṃskṛti [ವೈದಿಕಸಂಸ್ಕೃತಿ ]

122) Ādhyātmika SatyānvEṣaṇe [ಆಧ್ಯಾತ್ಮಿಕ ಸತ್ಯಾನ್ವೇಷಣೆ ]

=== Ācāragrantha [ಆಚಾರಗ್ರಂಥಗಳು] ===
123) ŚrīVedavyāsapūjāvidhi [ಶ್ರೀವೇದವ್ಯಾಸಪೂಜಾವಿಧಿ]

124) Ekādaśīvrata [ಏಕಾದಶೀವ್ರತ]

125) Ekādaśīmahime [ಏಕಾದಶೀಮಹಿಮೆ]

126) Śrīkṛṣṇajayantīvrata [ಶ್ರೀಕೃಷ್ಣಜಯಂತೀವ್ರತ]

127) Madhvanāmāvali [ಮಧ್ವನಾಮಾವಲಿ]

128) Adhikamāsa [ಅಧಿಕಮಾಸ]

129) Cāturmāsyavrata [ಚಾತುರ್ಮಾಸ್ಯವ್ರತ]

130) Sadācāravinoda (bhāga-1) [ಸದಾಚಾರವಿನೋದ (ಭಾಗ-೧)]

131) Sadācāravinoda (bhāga-2) [ಸದಾಚಾರವಿನೋದ (ಭಾಗ-೨)]

132) Sampradāyapaddhati [ಸಂಪ್ರದಾಯಪದ್ಧತಿ]

133) Taptamudrādhāraṇa [ತಪ್ತಮುದ್ರಾಧಾರಣ]

== English works ==
=== Authored ===
1. Life and Works of Śrī Madhvācārya
2. Nyāyamuktāvali of Śrī Rāghavendratīrtha
3. Authenticy of Un-traceable quotations of Śrī Madhvācārya
4. Light of Mahabharata (2014)
5. Bhagavadgītā (translation)
6. Ekādaśīvrata
7. Holy Pājaka
8. Aṃśāvatāra
9. Extracts from "Madhvācārya for youth Workshop" (Vol-1), 2007
10. Extracts from "Madhvācārya for youth Workshop (Vol-2), 2008
11. Gītā Madhu (Essence of Bhagavadgītā), 1995
12. Light of Mahābharata, 2014
13. Glimpses of Bhāgavatam, 2005
14. The Glory of Bhagavadgītā, 1996
15. Śrī Rāghavendra Darshana (Life of Śrī Rāghavendra Svāmiji), 2017
16. Works of Śrī Rāghavendra Svāmiji
17. Raghavendra Darshana (Abridged), 2015
18. Sadācāra Vinoda, 1996

== Telugu works ==
Prabhanjanacharya has edited and brought out "Sarvamūlagranthas" of ŚrīMadhvācārya in the Telugu script in 2003.

1. Vol. 1: Gītāprasthāna [సంపుటం-౧: గీతాప్రస్థానమ్]
2. Vol. 2: Sūtraprasthāna [సంపుటం-౨: సూత్రప్రస్థానమ్]
3. Vol. 3: Upaniṣatprasthāna [సంపుటం-౩: ఉపనిషత్ప్రస్థానమ్]
4. Vol. 4: Śrutiprasthāna, saṅkīrṇaprasthāna [సంపుట-౪: శ్రుతిప్రస్థానమ్, సంకీర్ణప్రస్థానమ్]
5. Vol. 5: Itihāsaprasthāna [సంపుటం-౫: ఇతిహాసప్రస్థానమ్]
6. Vol. 6: Śrīmadbhāgavatatātparyanirṇaya [సంపుటం-౬: శ్రీమద్భాగవతతాత్పర్యనిర్ణయః]

== Works translated to other languages ==
More than 30 works of Prabhanjanacharya have been translated to other languages.

=== Works translated to Telugu ===
1. Bhagavadgīta [భగవద్గీతా], 2015
2. Harivāyustuti [హరివాయుస్తుతి], 2013
3. Śrīguru Madhvācaryula Caritramu [శ్రీమధ్వాచార్యులచరిత్రము], 2017
4. Śrī Jayatīrthulu [శ్రీజయతీర్థులు], 2005
5. Tīrthaprabandhamu [తీర్థప్రబంధము], 1996
6. Sadācāravinodamu [సదాచారవినోదము], 1995
7. Bhagavadgītā Māhātmya [భగవద్గీతామాహాత్మ్య], 2015
8. Mahābhāratamulu Bhīmasenudu [మహాభారతములు భీమసేనుడు], 2004
9. Aṃśāvatāramu [అంశావతారము], 2013
10. Pavitra pājaka Kṣetramu [పవిత్ర పాజకక్షేత్రము], 2015
11. Śrīmadbhagavata Sāramu [శ్రీమద్భాగవతసారము], 2015
12. Stotramālikā, Part-1 [స్తోత్రమాలికా - ౧], 1991
13. Stotramālikā, Part-2 [స్తోత్రమాలికా - ౨], 1992
14. Stotramālikā, Part-3 [స్తోత్రమాలికా - ౩], 1993

=== Works translated to Tamil ===
1. Gītā Madhu [கீதாமது], 2005
2. Bhagavadgītā [பகவத்கீதா], 2005
3. Bhāgavatattin Oḷikkadirgaḷ [பாகவதத்தின் ஒளிக்கதிர்கள்], 2005
4. Ekādaśī Vratam [ஏகாதஶீ வ்ரதம்], 2006
5. Pūrnaprajña darśanam [பூர்ணப்ரஜ்ஞ தர்ஶனம்], 2007
6. Śrī Jayatīrthar [ஶ்ரீஜயதீர்த்தர்], 2016
7. Maṇampūṇḍi mahān (Biography of śrīraghūottamatīrtha) [மணம்பூண்டி மஹான்], 2009
8. Adhika Māsam [அதிக மாஸம்], 2018
9. Cāturmāsya Vratam [சாதுர்மாஸ்யவ்ரதம்], 2018
10. Tīrthaprabandham [தீர்த்தப்ரபந்தம்]
11. Rāghavendra Darśanam [ராகவேந்த்ர தர்ஶனம்]
12. Sundarakāṇḍa Nirṇayam [ஸுந்தரகாண்ட நிர்ணயம்]

=== Works translated to Hindi ===
1. Bhāgavat Prakāś [भागवत प्रकाश], 2015
2. Śrī Rāghavendra Darśan [राघवेन्द्र दर्शन], 2020

=== Work translated to Marathi ===
1. ŚrīPūrnaprajña Darśana [श्रीपूर्णप्रज्ञ दर्शन], 2017
2. Harikathāmṛtasāra [हरिकथामृतसार]
3. Haribhaktisāra [हरिभक्तिसार ]
4. Madhvabhārata [मध्वभारत]

== Present activities ==
=== Founder-director ===
Dr. Vyasanakere Prabhanjanacharya the founder-director of the following institutions:

1. Sri VyasaMadhwa Samshodhana Pratishthana
2. Sri VyasaMadhwa Research Foundation
3. Govardhana Pratiśthana
4. Sri Raghavendra Vedanta Pathashala
5. Sri Jayatīrtha Sanskrit Manuscripts Library
6. Aitareya Prakaśana

=== Daily classes ===
Prabhanjanacharya has been conducting daily classes on Nyāya, Vyākaraṇa and Vedanta since 1985. As of December 2020, he has completed the teachings of -

1) Sarvamūla works of Śrī Madhvācārya with commentaries three times;

2) Nyāyasudhā of Śrī Jayatīrtha two times;

3) Brahmasūtra, Bhagavadgītā, Upaniṣads and Bhāgavatapurāna with commentaries several times.

== Awards, honours and references ==
Prabhanjanacharya is the recipient of many awards and honours. In 2005 he was awarded with prestigious President's award for his contribution to the Sanskrit language. Some of the awards conferred on him are listed below.

=== Government awards ===
Sl. No.	Year of award or honour	Name of award or honour	Awarding organisation
1.	2024-25 (Awarded on 18-Nov-2024)	"Kanaka Sri" Award	Government of Karnataka
1.	2005	President's Award of Certificate of Honour	Government of India
2.	2002	Rajyotsava Award	Government of Karnataka
3.	1999	Best Sanskrit Scholar Award	Government of Karnataka
4.	2017	Purandarotsava Prashasti	Government of Karnataka
5.	1995	Vidyavaridhi	Rashtriya Sanskrit Vidyapeetha, Tirupati

=== Awards from spiritual institutions ===
Sl. No.	Year of award or honour	Name of award or honour	Awarding organisation
6.	1987	Vidyavachaspati (विद्यावाचस्पति)	Sri Raghavendra Matha, Mantralayam
7.	1999	Vidvacchudamani (विद्वच्चूडामणि)	Sri Raghavendra Matha, Mantralayam
8.	2005	Raghavendra Prashasti (राघवेन्द्रप्रशस्ति)	Sri Raghavendra Matha, Mantralayam
9.	2018	Suvarnakankana Prashasti (सुवर्णकङ्कणप्रशस्ति)	Sri Raghavendra Matha, Mantralayam
10.	2001	Sujayashree Prashasti (सुजयश्रीप्रशस्ति)	Sri Raghavendra Matha, Mantralayam
11.	2005	Vidvacchekhara (विद्वच्छेखर)	Sri Raghavendra Matha, Mantralayam
12.	1986	Pravachanacharya (प्रवचनाचार्य)	Sri Vidyamanyateertha Swamiji of Sri Palimaru-Bhandarakeri Matha, Udupi
13.	1987	Panditaratnam (पण्डितरत्नम्)	Sri Vidyamanyateertha Swamiji of Sri Palimaru-Bhandarakeri Matha, Udupi
14.	1993	Sacchastravichakshanaratnam (सच्छास्त्रविचक्षणरत्नम्)	Sri Palimaru Matha, Udupi
15.	1995	Jnanaratnakara (ज्ञानरत्नाकर)	Sri Vidyamanyateertha Swamiji of Sri Palimaru-Bhandarakeri Matha, Udupi
16.	1985	Vedantavachaspati (वेदान्तवाचस्पति)	Sri Bhandarakeri Matha, Udupi
17.	2004	Vidyamanya Mahaprashasti (विद्यामान्यमहाप्रशस्ति)	Sri Vishveshateertha Swamiji, pontiff of Sri Pejavara Adhokshaja Matha, Udupi
18.	1987	Shastrapravachanakesari (शास्त्रप्रवचनकेसरी)	Sri Vishveshateertha Swamiji, pontiff of Sri Pejavara Adhokshaja Matha, Udupi
19.	2000	Paryayotsava Prashasti (पर्यायोत्सवप्रशस्ति)	Sri Vishveshateertha Swamiji, pontiff of Sri Paryaya Pejavara Adhokshaja Matha, Udupi
20.	2014	Paravidyamanya Prashasti (परविद्यामान्यप्रशस्ति)	Sri Vidyadheeshateertha Swamiji, pontiff of Sri Palimaru Margam Udupi
21.	2019	Sarvamoola Prashasti (सर्वमूलप्रशस्ति)	Sri Vidyadheeshateertha Swamiji, pontiff of Sri Palimaru Margam Udupi
22.	2000	Vidyamanya Prashasti (विद्यामान्यप्रशस्ति)	Sri Vidyadheeshateertha Swamiji, pontiff of Sri Palimaru Margam Udupi
23.	2002	Paryayotsava Prashasti (पर्यायोत्सवप्रशस्ति)	Sri Paryaya Palimaru Matha, Udupi
24.	2002	Asthana Vidwan (आस्थानविद्वान्)	Sri Krishna Matha, Udupi
25.	2019	Dhyanapramoda Prashasti (ध्यानप्रमोदप्रशस्ति)	Sri Satyatmateertha Swamiji, Sri Uttaradi Matha
26.	2014	Sri Jayatirtha Anugraha Prashasti (श्रीजयतीर्थानुग्रहप्रशस्ति)	Sri Satyatmateertha Swamiji, Sri Uttaradi Matha
27.	2001	Vyasaraja Anugraha Prashasti (व्यासराजानुग्रहप्रशस्ति)	Sri Vyasaraja Matha
28.	2002	Vyasaraja Vidya Puraskara (व्यासराजविद्यापुरस्कार)	Sri Vyasaraja Matha
29.	2003	Vyasaraja Prashasti (व्यासराजप्रशस्ति)	Sri Vyasaraja Matha
30.	2006	Dhruva Prashasti (ध्रुवप्रशस्ति)	Sri Sripadaraja Matha, Mulbagal
31.	1994	Darshanaratnam (दर्शनरत्नम्)	Sri Vishvottamateertha Swamiji, Sri Sode Vadiraja Matha
32.	1999	VyasaMadhva Prashasti (व्यासमध्वप्रशस्ति)	Sri Kaniyur Matha, Udupi
33.	2014	Paryayotsava Prashasti (पर्यायोत्सवप्रशस्ति)	Sri Kaniyur Matha, Udupi
34.	2015	Vidyasamudra Prashati (विद्यासमुद्रप्रशस्ति)	Sri Kaniyur Matha, Udupi
35.	2015	Sri Narasimhanugraha Prashasti (श्रीनरसिंहानुग्रहप्रशस्ति)	Sri Kaniyur Matha, Udupi
36.	2015	Sri Narasimha-Krishnaanugraha Prashasti (श्रीनरसिंहकृष्णानुग्रहप्रशस्ति)	Sri Kaniyur Matha, Udupi
37.	2014	Paryayotsava Prashasti (पर्यायोत्सवप्रशस्ति)	Sri Paryaya Kaniyur Matha, Udupi
38.	1995	Nyayakovida Prashasti (न्यायकोविदप्रशस्ति)	Sri Vidyamanyateertha Swamiji of Sri Palimaru-Bhandarakeri Matha, Udupi
39.	2017	Geetaaratna Prashasti (गीतारत्नप्रशस्ति)	Sri Puttige Matha, Udupi
40.	2016	Nadopasana Prashati (नादोपासनप्रशस्ति)	Sri Hrisheekeshateertha Peetha, Udupi
41.	2001	Bhandarakeri Rajahamsa Prashasti (भण्डारकेरिराजहंसप्रशस्ति)	Sri Vidyeshateertha Swamiji, Sri Bhandarakeri Matha, Udupi
42.	2000	Madhvamatavardhana Prashasti (मध्वमतवर्धनप्रशस्ति)	Sri Vidyeshateertha Swamiji, Sri Bhandarakeri Matha, Udupi
43.	2008	Vishvamoolamanya Prashasti (विश्वमूलमान्यप्रशस्ति)	Sri Vidyeshateertha Swamiji, Sri Bhandarakeri Matha, Udupi
44.	2014	Sarvamoola Prabhakara (सर्वमूलप्रभाकर)	Sri Vidyeshateertha Swamiji, Sri Bhandarakeri Matha, Udupi
45.	2016	Mahabharataratna (महाभारतरत्न)	Sri Vidyeshateertha Swamiji, Sri Bhandarakeri Matha, Udupi
46.	2019	Vedapeetha Prashasti (वेदपीठप्रशस्ति)	Sri Vidyeshateertha Swamiji, Sri Bhandarakeri Matha, Udupi
47.	2012	Jayateerthavicakshana Prashasti (जयतीर्थविचक्षणप्रशस्ति)	Sri Vidyeshateertha Swamiji, Sri Bhandarakeri Matha, Udupi
48.	2012	Bharatatilaka Prashati (भारततिलकप्रशस्ति)	Sri Vidyeshateertha Swamiji, Sri Bhandarakeri Matha, Udupi
49.	2022	Krutiratnabhaaskara Prashati (कृतिरत्नभास्करप्रशस्ति)	Sri Vidyeshateertha Swamiji, Sri Bhandarakeri Matha, Udupi
50.	2017	Vidvan Galagali Pandharinathacharya Memorial Award (विद्वान् गलगलि पण्डरीनाथाचार्यप्रशस्ति)	Sri Raghavendra Swami Matha, Belagavi
51.	2007	Garuda Prashasti (गरुडप्रशस्ति)	Sri Madhvateertha Mahasamsthanam, Madhavapura, Tambihalli, Kolar Dist.

=== Awards from other Institutions ===
Sl. No.	Year of award or honour	Name of award or honour	Awarding organisation
52.	2003	Tattvavachaspati (तत्त्ववाचस्पति)	Tattvajnana Parishat, Bangalore
53.	2002	Gitaratnakara (गीतारत्नाकर)	Rama Mandira, NR Colony, Bangalore
54.	2007	Vedavidyavichakshana (वेदविद्याविचक्षण)	Vedadharma Paripalana Sabha, Bangalore
55.	2017	Vedavyasa Prashasti (वेदव्यासप्रशस्ति)	Rama Seva Mandali, Bangalore
56.	2017	Vidyaamaanya Prashasti (विद्यामान्यप्रशस्ति)	Tantrasaaraagama Sangha, Mysore
57.	2005	Panditaratna Prashasti (पण्डितरत्नप्रशस्ति)	Madhva Sangha, Chamarajapet, Bengaluru
58.	2014	Vyasatattvajna Prashasti (व्यासतत्त्वज्ञप्रशस्ति)	Anugraha Sangeeta Pratishthana
59.	2016	Vyasa Samman (व्याससम्मान्)	Vyasa Vidyapeetha, Bengaluru
60.	2006	Hulishri Prashasti (हुलिश्रीप्रशस्ति)	Hulikunte Swamy Seva Sangha, Bommaghatta
61.	2022	PrasannaVenkata Prashati (प्रसन्नवेङ्कटप्रशस्ति)	Srinivasa Trust and Haridasasampada Trust, Maddur
62.	2016	Vijayavitthala Prashati (विजयविट्ठलप्रशस्ति)	Karnataka Sangeeta Kala Vedike (Academy)
63.	2008	Panditaprashasti (पण्डितप्रशस्ति)	Kannada Sahitya Parishat, Padmanabhanagara, Bengaluru
64.	2001	Kalkura Prashasti	Kalkura Pratishthana, Mangalore
65.	2005	Jayaprakash Narayan State Award for Sanskrit	Basavanagudi Research Foundation, Bangalore
66.	2005	Aryabhata State Award for Research	Aryabhata Research Foundation, Bangalore
67.	1999	Eminent Personalities of India (Award)	Indian Biographical Research Foundation, New Delhi
68.	2002	Distinguished Leadership Award	Indian Biographical Research Foundation, New Delhi
69.	2005	Samskrutisampanna	Nivarana Organization, Bangalore
70.	2015	Nivarana Award	Nivarana Organization, Bangalore
71.	2022	Padmaveda-vibhushana International Award	Veena Tattva Prakashika, PES University, Bangalore

=== Special honours ===
President of All India Philosophical Conference-1994, Bangalore, organized by Sri Vishveshateertha Swamiji, pontiff of Sri Pejavara Adhokshaja Matha, Udupi.

=== Other honours ===
1. Asthana Vidvan, Sri Paryaya Pejavara Adhokshaja Matha, Udupi
2. Asthana Vidvan, Sri Paryaya Palimaru Matha, Udupi
3. Asthana Vidvan, Sri Paryaya Kaniyur Matha, Udupi
4. Dharmadhikari, SMSO Sabha, Tiruchanur, Andhra Pradesh

=== Special invitee ===
1. World Sanskrit Conference - 1996, Bangalore.
2. World Sanskrit Conference - 2000, New Delhi.
3. Akhila Karnataka Sanskrit Conference - 1974 and 1978
4. World Geeta Conference, Bharatiya Vidya Bhavan, 2014

=== Recognitions ===
1. Member, Central Govt. Nominee (HRD Representative), Project Committee of Sanskrit Dictionary Project, Deccan College Postgraduate & Research Institute, Poona.
2. Ex-Member, Central Govt. Nominee(Ex) (HRD Representative), Purnaprajna Samshodhana Mandiram (Shodh Sansthan), Bangalore
3. Vice President, National Institute of Vedic Sciences, Bangalore.
4. Member, NAAC(National Assessment and Accreditation Council), UGC.
5. Advisor, Mahabharata Samshodhana Pratishtana, Bangalore.
6. Member, Expert Committee, DVS Research Foundation, Bangalore.
7. Member, Expert Committee, Purnaprajna Samshodhana Mandiram, Bangalore.
8. Ex-Member, Academic Council, Bangalore University
9. Trustee, Purnaprajna Vidyapeetha, Bangalore
10. Trustee, ABMM Abhivardhaka Mandala, Bangalore
11. Member, Board of Studies, Jain University, Bangalore
12. Dean, National Institute of Vedic Sciences, Bangalore
13. Member, Vidyamanya Award Committee, Sri Pejavara Matha, Bangalore
14. Member, Expert Committee, Sri Sudha Monthly
15. Member, Expert Committee, Tattvavada Monthly
16. Member, Expert Committee, Madhwa Siddhanta, SMSO Sabha, Tiruchanur

=== References ===
Prabhanjanacharya's achievements have been mentioned in several Reference Books.

Referred in	Published by	Year
Sahitya Academy, New Delhi	Sahitya Academy	1996
Indo-European Who's Who	FI Publications, New Delhi	1999
Eminent Personalities of India	National Library, Calcutta	2000
Reference Asia	Rifacimento International, New Delhi	2002
Distinguished and Admirable Achievers	South Asia International Pub. Co., New Delhi, 3rd Edition	2005

== See also ==
- Dvaita
- Works of Madhvacharya
- Bannanje Govindacharya
- Aralumallige Parthasarathy
