= Jerzy Andrzej Filar =

Polish Australian mathematician (born 1949)

Jerzy Filar Emeritus Professor
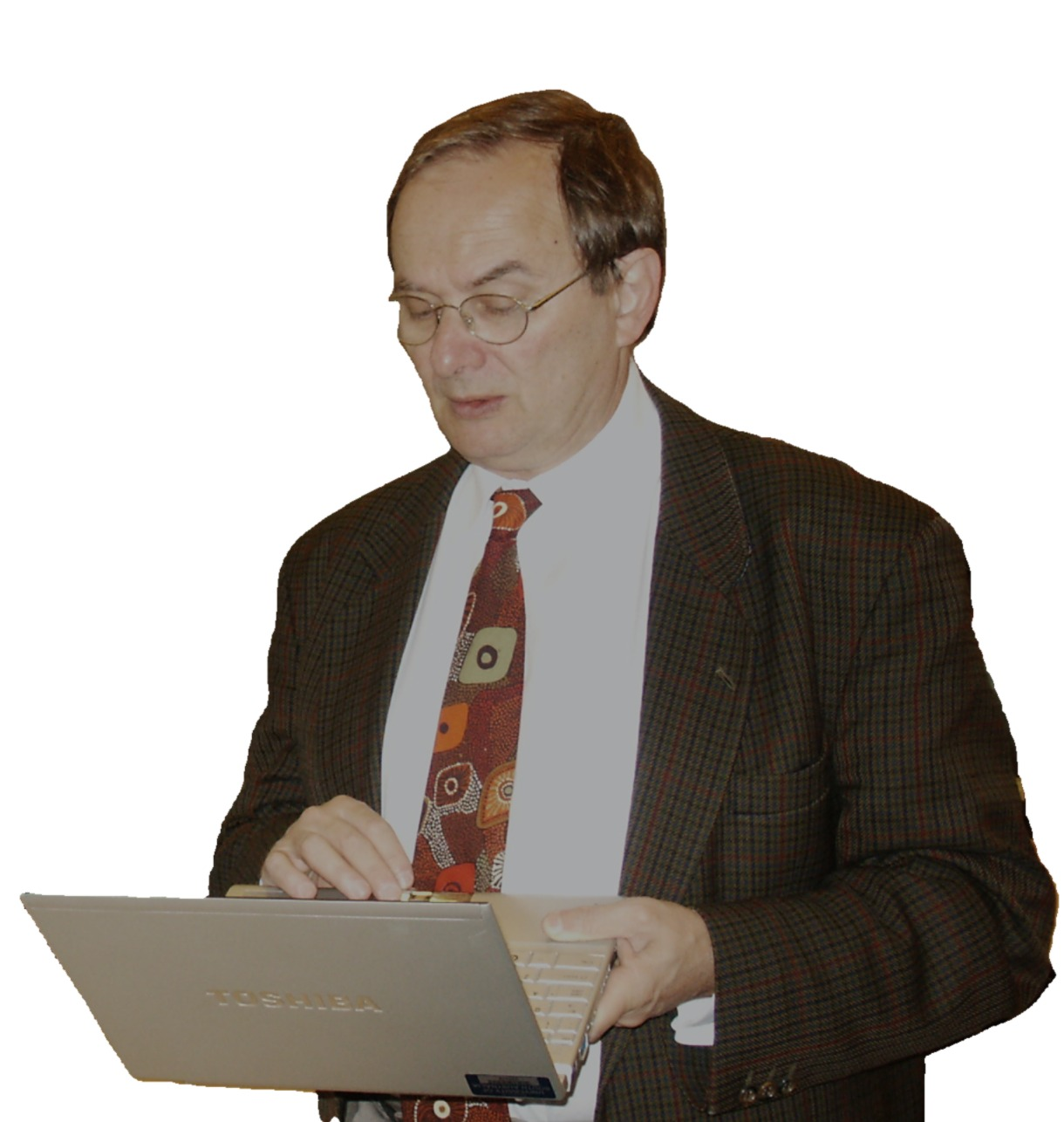
- Filar in 2008
- Born: 30 August 1949 (age 77); Warsaw (Żoliborz), Poland
- Occupations: Mathematician, science fiction novelist
- Title: Emeritus Professor of Applied Mathematics
- Awards: Fellow of the Australian Mathematical Society (2003).; Ren Potts Medal of the Australian Society for Operations Research (2005); South Australian Science Excellence Award: Science Leadership and Management Category (2007).

Academic background
- Education: University of Melbourne; Monash University; University of Illinois, Chicago
- Thesis: Algorithms for Solving Undiscounted Stochastic Games(PhD) (1980)
- Doctoral advisor: T. E. S. Raghavan

Academic work
- Discipline: Mathematics
- Sub-discipline: Game theory, stochastic modelling, optimization, perturbation theory, environmental modelling
- Institutions: Monash University; University of Minnesota; Johns Hopkins University; University of Maryland; University of South Australia; Flinders University; University of Queensland
- Website: Home page www.researchgate.net/lab/Jerzy-A-Filar-Lab

Jerzy Andrzej Filar (born August 30, 1949, in Warsaw, Żoliborz) is an Australian mathematician of Polish origin, His interests include operations research, stochastic modelling, game theory, Markov decision processes, perturbation theory, and environmental modelling.

== Biography ==
He received his early education at Primary School No. 1 in Warsaw. In 1964, he moved to Melbourne, Australia, where he attended Kew High School. In 1972, he obtained a B.Sc (Hons) degree in Mathematical Statistics from the University of Melbourne, followed by an M.Sc. in Statistics from Monash University in 1975, and a M.A. in Mathematics from University of Illinois Chicago in 1977. In 1980, he completed his PhD at the University of Illinois Chicago, defending his thesis titled Algorithms for Solving Undiscounted Stochastic Games. His doctoral advisor was T.E.S. Raghavan.

== Academic career ==
Since 1975, Jerzy A. Filar held various academic positions at institutions across Australia and the United States. He began his career as a Tutor at Monash University (1975–1976) before serving as a Visiting assistant professor at the University of Minnesota (1979–1980). He then held faculty positions at Johns Hopkins University (1980–1986) and the University of Maryland, Baltimore County (1986–1991), where he progressed from Associate to Full Professor.

In 1992, he joined University of South Australia as Professor of Mathematics and Statistics, later serving as Director of the Centre for Industrial and Applied Mathematics (1994–1998) and Foundation Chair of Mathematics and Statistics (2001–2011). He then became Strategic Professor at Flinders University (2011–2016) and later Professor of Applied Mathematics and Director of the Centre for Applied Resource Mathematics at the University of Queensland (2016–2020).

Filar also served as a supervisor or co-supervisor in over thirty Ph.D. dissertations.

Filar retired at the end of 2020 and assumed the role of emeritus Professor at the University of Queensland.

== Editorial works ==
He held several editorial roles in academic publishing, including Editor-in-Chief of Environmental Modelling and Assessment (Springer), Honorary Theme Editor for "Mathematical Models" in UNESCO's Encyclopedia of Life Support Systems (EOLSS), and Associate Editor for multiple journals, such as Journal of Mathematical Analysis and Applications (Elsevier), Operations Research (INFORMS, 2011–2015), Dynamic Games and Applications (Springer), and Applicationes Mathematicae, a prestigious Polish journal founded by Hugo Steinhaus. He also served as Co-editor of International Game Theory Reviews (World Scientific) and contributed to the Annals of Dynamic Games (International Society of Dynamic Games).

== Research impacts ==
Filar is an applied mathematician with research interests in operations research, stochastic modelling, optimization, game theory, and environmental modelling. He supervised or co-supervised 31 PhD theses.

He authored 148 scholarly works, including articles, books, book chapters, and conference papers. Three books are:

- Competitive Markov Decision Processes (Springer, 1997; co-authored with K. Vrieze) serves as a textbook on stochastic games and Markov decision processes, under the unifying concept of "Competitive Markov decision processes" for discrete-time models with finite number of states and actions.
- Analytic Perturbation Theory and Its Applications (SIAM, 2013; co-authored with K.E. Avrachenkov and P.G. Howlett) presents a unified analysis of algebraic systems dependent on small perturbation parameters, applied to fields such as Markov processes and optimization.
- Hamiltonian Cycle Problem and Markov Chains (Springer, 2012; co-authored with V.S. Borkar, V. Ejov, and G.T. Nguyen).

In game theory he introduced the concepts of switching controller stochastic game and games with incompetent players and explored a formulation of dynamic cooperative game. In operations research he pioneered embeddings of the Hamiltonian cycle problem in Markov decision processes. In environmental modeling he investigated uncertainty propagation and risk sensitivity to small changes in model parameters. This linked to his more theoretical study of perturbation theory.

In his final role as Director of the Centre for Applications in Resource Management (CARM), he worked on tools and simulations for evaluating the impacts of harvest policy changes.

== Honours and awards ==
In 1985 he was awarded Environmental Science and Engineering Fellowship from the American Association for the Advancement of Science. In 2006, he was granted an Australian Research Council Professorial Fellowship (2006–2010).

His professional recognition include the 1981 Dr. Gurdas Chatterjee OPSEARCH Best Paper Award, the 2003 Fellow of the Australian Mathematical Society, and the 2005 Ren Potts Medal from the Australian Society for Operations Research. In 2007, he received the South Australian Science Excellence Award for Science Leadership and Management. In 2013, he was appointed to the Australian Research Council College of Experts.

== Science fiction novelist ==
Since 2021, Filar has held the title of emeritus Professor of Applied Mathematics. His academic career in the United States and Australia has informed his analysis of the interplay between technological advancements and the sustainability of Earth's life support systems. This led to the publication of his science fiction novel, YASMIN: The First Non-Artificial Intelligence Tool, which incorporates mathematical concepts into its narrative.
