= Sanathana Sarathi =

Sanathana Sarathi may refer to:

- Sanātana Sārathi (translated as "eternal charioteer"), a name of the Hindu god Krishna
- Sanathana Sarathi, a magazine by the Sathya Sai Organization

== See also ==
- Sanathana, one of the four Kumaras, or sons of Brahma in Hinduism
- Sarathi (disambiguation)
