= Poornaprajna Vidyapeetha =

Gurukula in Bangalore, India

- Formation: 1956 (69 years ago)
- Founder: Sri Vishwesha Teertha Swamiji
- Type: Religious organization
- Purpose: Educational, Religious studies, Spirituality
- Location: Katriguppa Main road, Bangalore
- Coordinates: 12.933889°N 77.560833°E
- Website: https://www.ppsm.res.in/

Poornaprajna Vidyapeetha is a gurukula in Bangalore, that was founded by Sri Vishwesha Teertha Swamiji of Pejawara Matha, Udupi in 1956. It is dedicated to the preservation and propagation of Indian philosophical texts.

== History ==
The organization was established by Sri Vishwesha Teertha Swamiji in 1956. Swamiji's in his twenties took up the initiative of building an organization and went around collecting donations He set it up at a three and half acre land, purchased for Rs 7000, in a then remote Kattriguppe in South-West, Bangalore, with 12 students and two teachers.

== Campus ==
The campus of three-and-a-half acres has a research centre, Sanskrit school and college, a hostel, an auditorium, and a temple dedicated to Krishna, Madhwacharya, Vadiraja and Raghavendra Swami. It has a library with more than 20,000 books

== Education ==
Vidyapeetha has an intake of 53 new students each year, with over 350 total students studying in various streams. The institution bears all expenses of the education, including food and accommodation. Students typically join between the age of 8 and 14 and have undergone upanayana (sacred thread ceremony) as it a must to study Vedas. In the first four years, students study Sanskrit. Thereafter, they are taught Shastras, Mimamsa (reflection, critical investigation) Shastra and astrology along with Pourohitya (priesthood). After six years of initial studies, students pursue secondary, undergraduate, graduate and postgraduate courses. The subjects include stotras, mantras, kavya, vyakarana, tarka, Vedanta, pooja vidhana and the Sanskrit classics. At the end of the studies, which typically lasts 13 years, students get certificates from the Karnataka Samskrit University. After graduation, most students become teachers and priests.

== Vrindavana ==
Sri Vishwesha Teertha Swamiji's body, as per his wishes, was interred at the institution as per the Hindu tradition on December 30, 2019.
