= Parta =

Parta may refer to:

- Parta, Vršac, a village in Serbia
- Parta, Tibet, a village in Tibet
- Parța, a commune of Romania

PARTA may refer to:

- Pacific Islands Forum, an inter-governmental organization of countries in the Pacific Ocean
- Portage Area Regional Transportation Authority, a public transit authority in Portage County, Ohio

== See also ==
- Partha (disambiguation)
