= Vivek Borkar =

Indian electrical engineer and mathematician (born 1954)

- Born: 19 September 1954 (age 71); Maharashtra, India
- Education: IIT Bombay; Case Western Reserve University; University of California, Berkeley
- Known for: Introducing analytical paradigm in stochastic optimal control processes
- Awards: 1982 IEEE CSS Best Transactions Paper Award; 1992 Shanti Swarup Bhatnagar Prize; 2000 IIT Mumbai Distinguished Alumnus Award; 2008 INSA P. C. Mahalanobis Medal; 2008 Value Tools Best paper award; 2009 TWAS Prize; 2009 IFIP Wireless Days Best Paper Award
- Scientific career
- Fields: Stochastic control; Learning control theory; Stochastic process
- Workplaces: University of Twente; TIFR Centre for Applicable Mathematics; Indian Institute of Science; Tata Institute of Fundamental Research; IIT Bombay
- Doctoral advisor: Pravin Varaiya

Vivek Shripad Borkar (born 1954) is an Indian electrical engineer, mathematician and an Institute chair professor at the Indian Institute of Technology, Mumbai. He is known for introducing analytical paradigm in stochastic optimal control processes and is an elected fellow of all the three major Indian science academies viz. the Indian Academy of Sciences, Indian National Science Academy and the National Academy of Sciences, India. He also holds elected fellowships of The World Academy of Sciences, Institute of Electrical and Electronics Engineers, Indian National Academy of Engineering and the American Mathematical Society. The Council of Scientific and Industrial Research, the apex agency of the Government of India for scientific research, awarded him the Shanti Swarup Bhatnagar Prize for Science and Technology, one of the highest Indian science awards for his contributions to Engineering Sciences in 1992. (Note: Long link - please select award year to see details) He received the TWAS Prize of the World Academy of Sciences in 2009.

== Biography ==
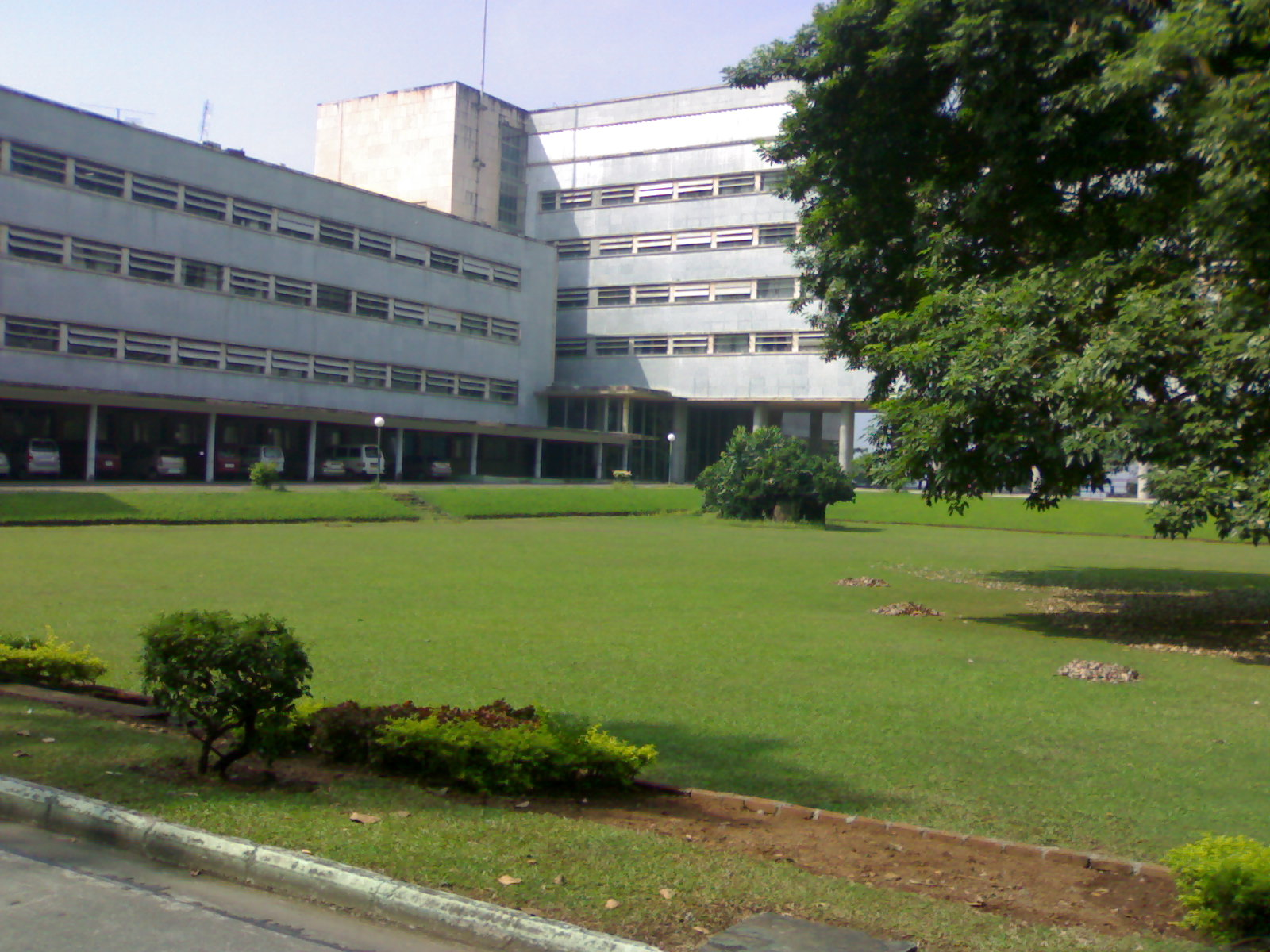
Tata Institute of Fundamental Research

Vivek S. Borkar, born on 19 September 1954 in the Indian state of Maharashtra, graduated in electrical engineering from the Indian Institute of Technology Bombay in 1976 and moved to the US where he pursued his master's studies in systems and control engineering at Case Western Reserve University to obtain an MS degree in 1977. Subsequently, he enrolled for doctoral studies at the University of California, Berkeley at the laboratory of Pravin Varaiya and secured a PhD for his thesis, Identification and Adaptive Control of Markov Chains, in 1980.

After his studies at University of California, Borkar moved to the Netherlands and worked as a visiting scientist at the University of Twente for one year. On his return to India in 1981, he joined the TIFR Centre for Applicable Mathematics, Bengaluru as a fellow where he stayed till his move to the Indian Institute of Science in 1989 as an assistant professor. He served IISc till 1999 and held the post of an associate professor at the time of his appointment at the Tata Institute of Fundamental Research (TIFR) as a professor (Grade G). He held various ranks of professorship at TIFR such as grades H to I and on his superannuation in 2011 as a Distinguished Professor, he moved to his alma mater, IIT Bombay, where he holds the position of a chair professor at the School of Technology and Computer Science.

== Legacy ==
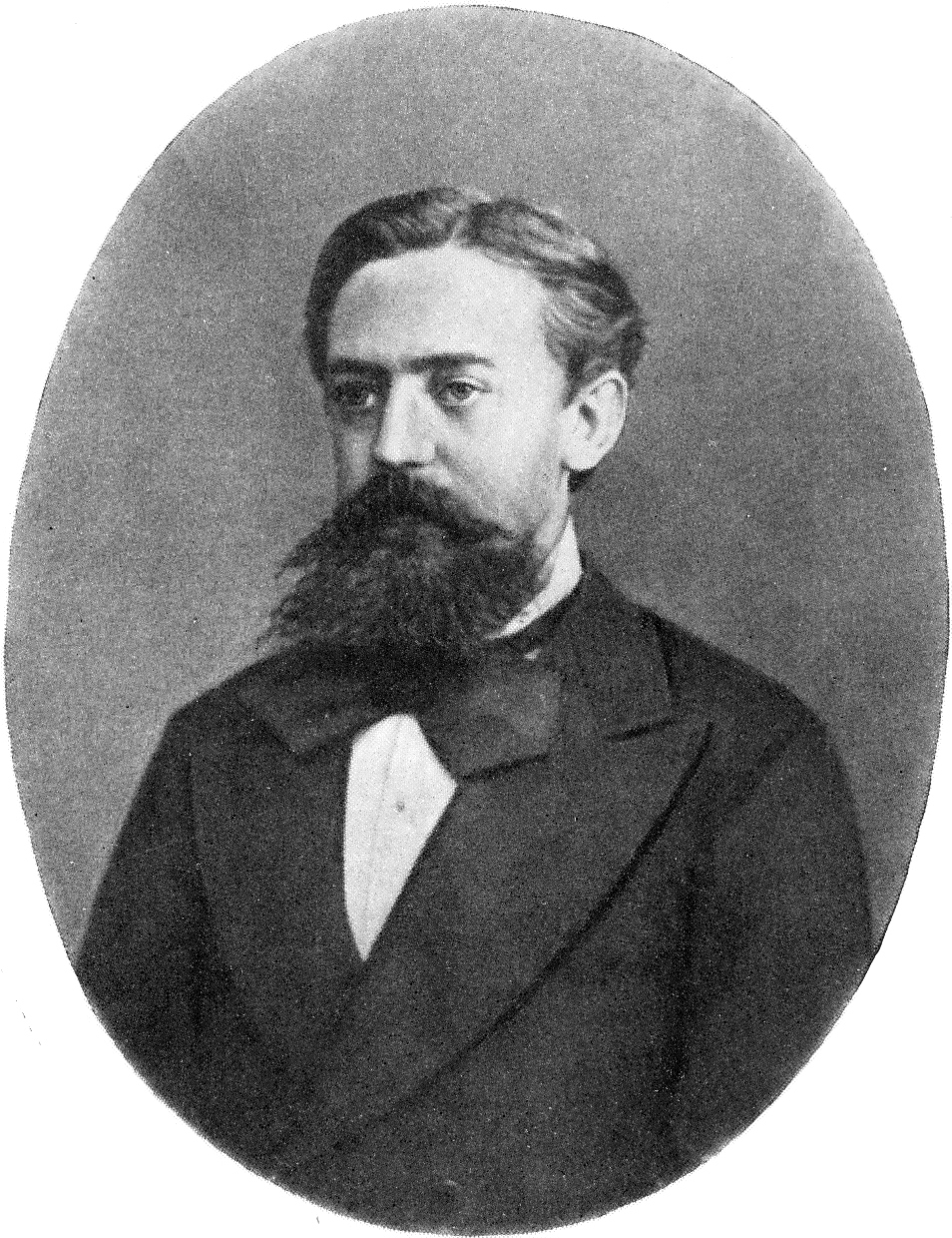
Andrei Andreyevich Markov, Russian mathematician known for his work on Stochastic processes

Borkar's researches were mainly in the fields of Stochastic control, Learning control theory and random processes and he is known to have introduced a new convex analytical paradigm based upon occupation measures. His work is reported to have assisted in bettering the understanding of Stochastic control issues and elucidated adaptive control schemes with regard to asymptotic optimality. He has worked on Distributed computation, Multiple timescales, Approximation and learning algorithms, Multiagent problems and Small noise limits and developed a protocol which used conditional version of importance sampling for the estimation of Markov chain averages; the scheme was later confirmed by a team of scientists from Massachusetts Institute of Technology. His researches have been documented in several peer-reviewed articles; (Note: Please see Selected articles section) and Google Scholar, an online article repository of scientific articles has listed 373 of them. Besides, he has published 5 books viz. Optimal control of diffusion processes, Probability Theory: An Advanced Course, Stochastic Approximation: A Dynamical Systems Viewpoint, Hamiltonian Cycle Problem and Markov Chains and Ergodic Control of Diffusion Processes. He has also contributed chapters to several books edited by others and has delivered a number of invited or keynote addresses including the address on Control and Optimization at the International Congress of Mathematicians held in Madrid in August 2006 and the Lecture on Probability and Stochastic Processes XI organized by Indian Statistical Institute, Delhi in November 2016.

Borkar has been associated with several science journals as an editor or a member of their editorial boards which included SIAM Journal of Control and Optimization, Systems and Control Letters, Journal of Indian Institute of Science, Sadhana; Proceedings of Indian Academy of Sciences (Engineering Science), Applicationes Mathematicae of Polish Academy of Sciences and Indian Journal of Pure and Applied Mathematics. He has served as a member of the executive committee of the Mumbai chapter of IEEE and has been an examiner for doctoral studies at University of Nice Sophia Antipolis.

== Awards and honors ==
Three of Borkar's papers have won awards, starting with Best Transactions Paper Award of the IEEE Control Systems Society in 1982, followed by the Best Paper Award of Value Tools in 2008 and Best Paper Award of IFIP Wireless Days in 2009. The Council of Scientific and Industrial Research awarded him the Shanti Swarup Bhatnagar Prize, one of the highest Indian science awards in 1992. He received the Distinguished Alumnus Award of the Indian Institute of Technology Bombay in 2000 and the Prasant Chandra Mahalanobis Medal of the Indian National Science Academy in 2008. The World Academy of Sciences selected him for the TWAS Prize in 2009.

Borkar was elected as a fellow by the Indian Academy of Sciences in 1993 and he received the Homi Bhabha Fellowship in 1995. He became an elected fellow of the Indian National Science Academy in 1996 and the Institute of Electrical and Electronics Engineers followed suit in 2002. Two years later, the Indian National Academy of Engineers and the National Academy of Sciences, India elected him as their fellow in 2004 and 2009 respectively; In between, he received the J. C. Bose National Fellowship of the Department of Science and Technology. The award orations delivered by Borkar include Abdi Memorial Lecture of Ramanujan Mathematical Society in 2006 and M. S. Huzurbazar Memorial Lecture of Bombay Mathematical Colloquium in 2012.

== Selected bibliography ==
=== Books ===
- Vivek S. Borkar (1989). Optimal control of diffusion processes. Longman Scientific & Technical. ISBN 978-0-470-21327-8.
- Vivek S. Borkar (5 October 1995). Probability Theory: An Advanced Course. Springer Science & Business Media. ISBN 978-0-387-94558-3.
- Vivek S. Borkar (1 September 2008). Stochastic Approximation: A Dynamical Systems Viewpoint. Cambridge University Press. ISBN 978-0-521-51592-4.
- Vivek S. Borkar; Vladimir Ejov; Jerzy A. Filar, Giang T. Nguyen (23 April 2012). Hamiltonian Cycle Problem and Markov Chains. Springer Science & Business Media. ISBN 978-1-4614-3232-6.
- Ari Arapostathis; Vivek S. Borkar; Mrinal K. Ghosh (2012). Ergodic Control of Diffusion Processes. Cambridge University Press. ISBN 978-0-521-76840-5.

=== Articles ===
- Borkar, Vivek Shripad; Sundaresan, Rajesh (2012). "Asymptotics of the invariant measure in mean field models with jumps". 2011 49th Annual Allerton Conference on Communication, Control, and Computing (Allerton). Vol. 2. pp. 322–380. doi:10.1109/Allerton.2011.6120312. ISBN 978-1-4577-1817-5.
- Borkar, Vivek S.; Filar, Jerzy A. (2011). "Markov chains, Hamiltonian cycles and volumes of convex bodies". Journal of Global Optimization. 55 (3): 633–639. doi:10.1007/s10898-011-9819-6. S2CID 46068527.
- Arapostathis, Ari; Borkar, Vivek S. (2010). "Uniform recurrence properties of controlled diffusions and applications to optimal control". SIAM Journal on Control and Optimization. 48 (7): 4181–4223. doi:10.1137/090762464.
- Kulkarni, Ankur A.; Borkar, Vivek S. (2009). "Finite dimensional approximation and Newton-based algorithm for stochastic approximation in Hilbert space". Automatica. 45 (12): 2815–2822. doi:10.1016/j.automatica.2009.09.031.
- Agarwal, Mukul; Borkar, Vivek S.; Karandikar, Abhay (2008). "Structural properties of optimal transmission policies over a randomly varying channel". IEEE Transactions on Automatic Control. 53 (6): 1476–1491. doi:10.1109/TAC.2008.925856. S2CID 6439701.

== See also ==
- Asymptotically optimal algorithm
- Hamiltonian path
- Random variable
- Mathematical model
