= Sarathi =

Sarathi, Saarathi or Sarathy may refer to:

== People with the name ==
- Sarathi (comedian) (1942–2022), Indian actor and producer
- Sarathi Baba, self-proclaimed Indian guru
- Brinda Sarathy, Indian film director
- M. P. Sarathy, politician from Tamil Nadu, India
- M.S. Partha Sarathi (born 1961), politician from Andhra Pradesh, Indian
- Sanjana Sarathy, Indian actress
- Sarathy Korwar, Indian musician
- Sunitha Sarathy, Indian singer

== Other uses ==
- Sarathi (name of Krishna), a name for the Hindu god Krishna, meaning "charioteer"
- Saarathi, a 2011 Indian film
- Sarathi, Karnataka, a settlement in Davanagere district, Karnataka, India
- Sarathi Studios, a film studio in Hyderabad, India
- Sarathi Socio Cultural Trust, an NGO in Bangalore, India

== See also ==
- Parthasarathy (disambiguation)
