= Partha =

Partha (Sanskrit: pārtha) may refer to:

- Partha, an epithet of Arjuna, a character of the Mahabharata
- Partha, a given name (for a list of people with the name, see)

== See also ==
- Parthasarathy (disambiguation)
- Parthia (disambiguation)
- Parta (disambiguation)
- Parth (disambiguation)
