= Parth =

Parth may refer to:

== People ==
=== Given name ===
- Parth Bhalerao (born 2000), Indian actor
- Parth Bhut (born 1997), Indian cricketer
- Parth Chauhan (born 1995), Indian cricketer
- Parth Desai (born 1990), Canadian cricketer
- Parth Jindal (born 1990), Indian businessman
- Parth Kohli (born 1989), Indian cricketer
- Parth Rekhade, Indian cricketer
- Parth Sahani (born 1993), Indian cricketer
- Parth Samthaan (born 1991), Indian actor
- Parth Satwalkar (born 1974), Indian cricketer
- Parth Bharat Thakkar (born 1989), Indian singer, composer, and music director

=== Surname ===
- Benjamin Parth (born 1988), Austrian chef
- Johnny Parth (1930–2025), Austrian record producer and musician

== Other uses ==
- Arjuna, a character of the Mahabharata
- Parth (horse), a racehorse

== See also ==
- Partha (disambiguation)
- Paath
