= Avula Parthasarathy =

Indian philosopher (born 1927)

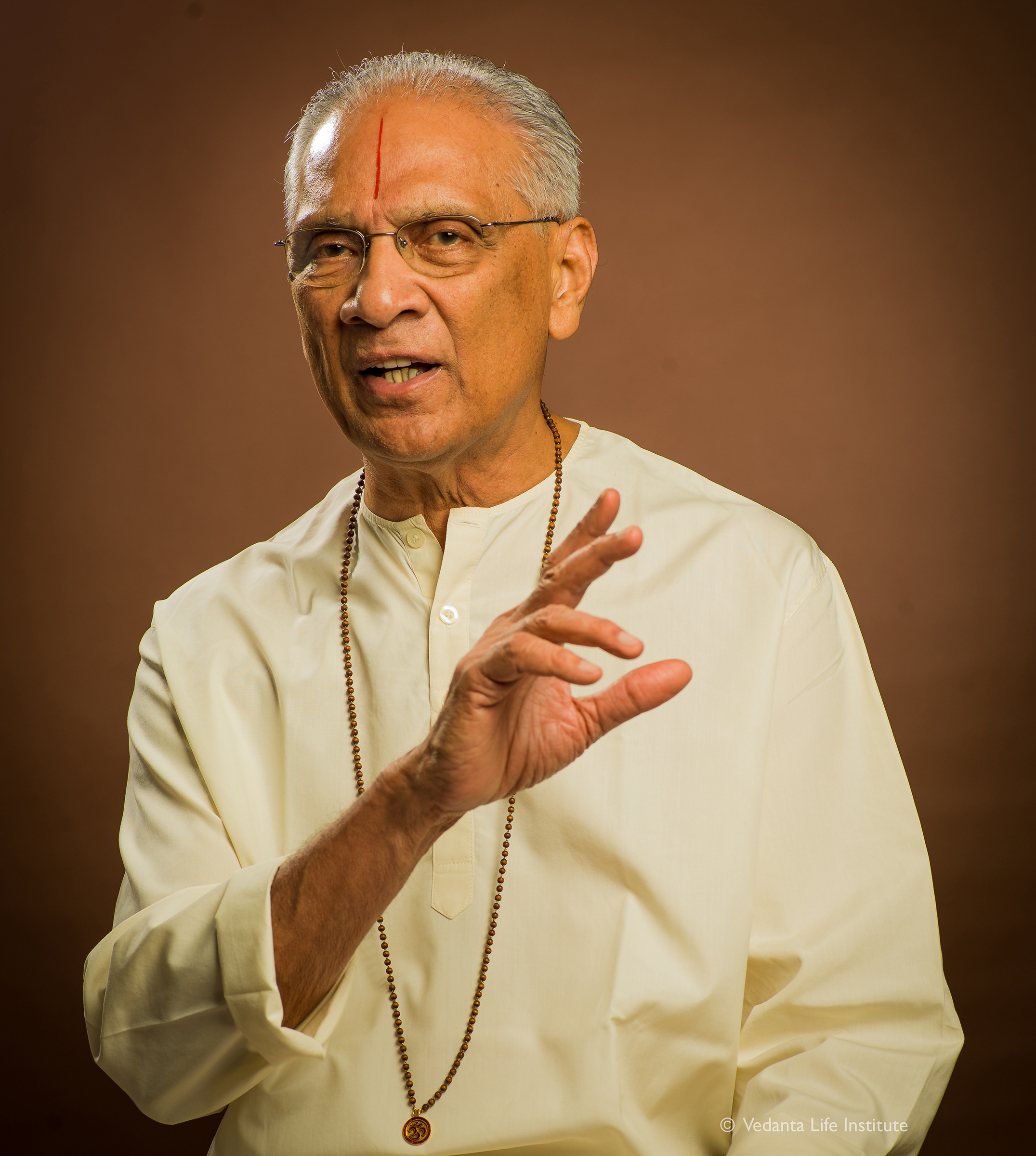
- Born: 8 June 1927 (age 99); Chennai, India
- Education: Loyola College, Chennai
- Occupations: Philosopher and author
- Spouse: Kausalya Parthasarathy
- Children: Sunanda Leelaram
- Website: www.vedantaworld.org

Avula Parthasarathy, popularly known as Swamiji (born 8 June 1927), is an Indian philosopher and exponent of Vedanta, one of the ancient philosophies of India. He translates the subtle philosophical themes into a practical technique of living. He has multiple degrees in literature, science and law, and completed a postgraduate degree in international law from London University. Renouncing a shipping business early in life, he has dedicated his life to study, research and propagation of Vedanta. His writings, discourses and seminars have featured in international press and television media. Business, sport and film celebrities regularly seek his counsel.

== Lifetime ==
At 94 years, Swamiji follows a daily schedule of yoga and jogging. He is also an accomplished sportsman, regularly winning most-valuable player awards for his Academy cricket team.

In over five decades of service, Swamiji's contribution has been the translation of subtle philosophical themes into practical techniques of living. An exercise that has reduced stress and increased productivity among human beings.

His personality and lifetime effort has been profiled in books prescribed for students in India:

- 101 Great Indians who have made India proud in the last century.
- 101 Great Indian Saints (portrayed on the front cover).
- 101 Great Indian Authors and Poets.
- The Mind of the Guru, foreworded by the Dalai Lama.

== Books ==
Swamiji has written twelve books, including three best sellers. The Complete Works of Swami Parthasarathy was released in 2012 as a single book. It contains all of Swamiji's publications:

- The Fall of the Human Intellect
- The Holocaust of Attachment
- Governing Business & Relationships
- Select English Poems
- Vedanta Treatise: The Eternities
- Bhaja Govindam
- Atmabodha
- Bhagavad Gita
- Choice Upanishads
- The Symbolism of Hindu Gods and Rituals
- Thesis on God
- Citations Tributes Quotes

== Vedanta Academy ==
In 1988, he founded the Vedanta Academy which runs continual three-year residential courses to disseminate Vedanta to students from India and abroad.

The Vedanta Academy offers three year full-time residential courses for students regardless of race or religion. They are taught a range of texts on Vedanta philosophy which includes select works from English literature and poetry as well. The academy's educational system is focused on the development of the human intellect and not merely providing intelligence on a subject. The medium of instruction is English with a module in Sanskrit language. On completion graduates are awarded a diploma in Vedanta philosophy.

== Corporate guru ==
Swamiji's lifetime research has formulated Self-management courses for corporations worldwide. He has been acclaimed as one of the leading corporate gurus for international institutions such as the Young Entrepreneurs' Organisation, Young Presidents' Organisation, World Presidents' Organisation, World Economic Forum and distinguished business schools.

=== Self-management ===
After decades of research, Swami Parthasarathy has developed practical techniques of Self-Management that increase productivity, reduce stress and develop the essential components of leadership.

His teachings develop the clarity in thinking needed to

- Reduce stress in everyday living
- Increase productivity at work
- Maintain harmony in relationships
- Master the technique of living

=== Speeches ===
He has spoken to

- The Festival of Thinkers as a keynote speaker alongside sixteen Nobel laureates
- The Aspen Ideas Festival, also as a keynote
- The Young Presidents' Organization
- The World Presidents' Organization
- The World Economic Forum
- Harvard
- Wharton
- NASA
- Microsoft
- Ford
- Indian cricket team

== Press coverage ==
Swami Parthasarathy has been featured in print and electronic media worldwide including

- Time
- The New Yorker
- BusinessWeek
- CNBC
- The Sunday Times
- New York Post
- The Times of India
