= International Game Theory Review =

- Discipline: Game theory
- Language: English
- Edited by: David Yeung

Publication details
- History: 1999-present
- Publisher: World Scientific
- Frequency: Quarterly

Standard abbreviations
- ISO 4: Int. Game Theory Rev.

Indexing
- ISSN: 0219-1989 (print); 1793-6675 (web)
- LCCN: 00200705
- OCLC no.: 49229284

Links
- Journal homepage

International Game Theory Review is a peer-reviewed academic journal published quarterly by World Scientific. It contains articles and surveys on theories and applications of game theory in socio-economic and political contexts and other related areas. Aside from regular articles on theory, methodology and application of games, it also includes case studies and articles on policy-making issues. The current managing editor is David Yeung (Hong Kong Shue Yan University).

== Abstracting and indexing ==
The journal is abstracted and indexed in:

- Journal of Economic Literature
- EconLit
- Mathematical Reviews
- International Bibliography of the Social Sciences
- Zentralblatt MATH
- Inspec
- Scopus
