= Giang Nguyen =

Vietnamese-Australian chess player (born 1985)

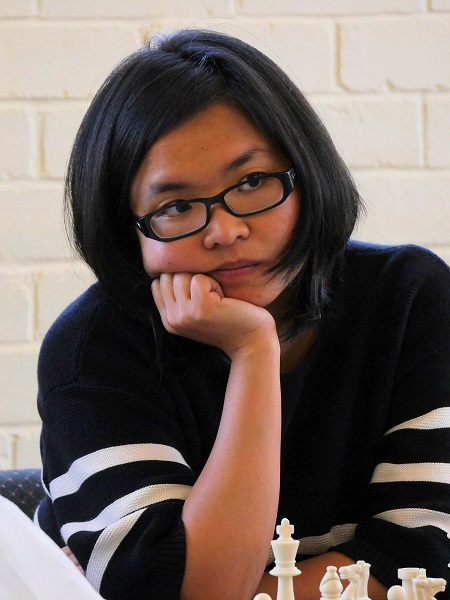
- Giang Nguyen at the 2013 Labour Day Weekender in Adelaide

Personal information
- Born: 2 October 1985 (age 40) Hanoi, Vietnam

Chess career
- Country: Vietnam (until 2007); Australia (since 2007)
- Title: Woman FIDE Master (2012)
- Peak rating: 2186 (September 2014)

This is a Vietnamese name; The family name is Nguyen.

Giang Thu Nguyen (born Nguyễn Thu Giang on 2 October 1985 in Hanoi) is a Vietnamese-Australian chess player and mathematician. She is a senior lecturer in Applied Mathematics at the University of Adelaide. In chess, she is a Woman FIDE Master (WFM), and has represented Australia in many Chess Olympiads. She has won the South Australian women's championship four times, and the South Australian (open) championship once.

== Chess ==
Nguyen began playing chess at the age of nine. She won the gold medal in Vietnamese Junior Girls Under 13 Championship in 1998, and the silver medal in Vietnamese Junior Girls Under 15 Championship in 1999.

Nguyen first represented Vietnam in the World Rapid Girls Under 14 Championship (Disneyland, Paris) in 1998. Representing Vietnam, she won a gold medal at the Asian Girls Under 14 Championship in 1999, a silver medal at the 2nd Children of Asia International Children Sports Games in 2000, and a silver medal in the ASEAN Girls Under 16 Championship in 2000.

In 2001, Nguyen moved to Adelaide, Australia. She came equal third in the Australian Junior Championship in Sydney in 2002.

Since 2008, Nguyen has been playing chess under the Australian flag. She has represented Australia in eight Chess Olympiads: in 2008, 2010, 2012, 2014, 2016, 2018, 2022, and 2024. In 2012, she scored 6/9 and was awarded the Woman FIDE Master (WFM) title for her result.

She won the (open) South Australian championship in 2014, and the women's championship in 2003, 2006, 2007 and 2008.

== Mathematics ==
Nguyen completed her PhD in mathematics from the University of South Australia (UniSA) in 2009 at the age of 23. This made her the youngest PhD graduate of UniSA and the second youngest from a South Australian university. Her dissertation, Hamiltonian Cycle Problem, Markov Decision Processes and Graph Spectra, was jointly supervised by Jerzy A. Filar and Vlad Ejov.

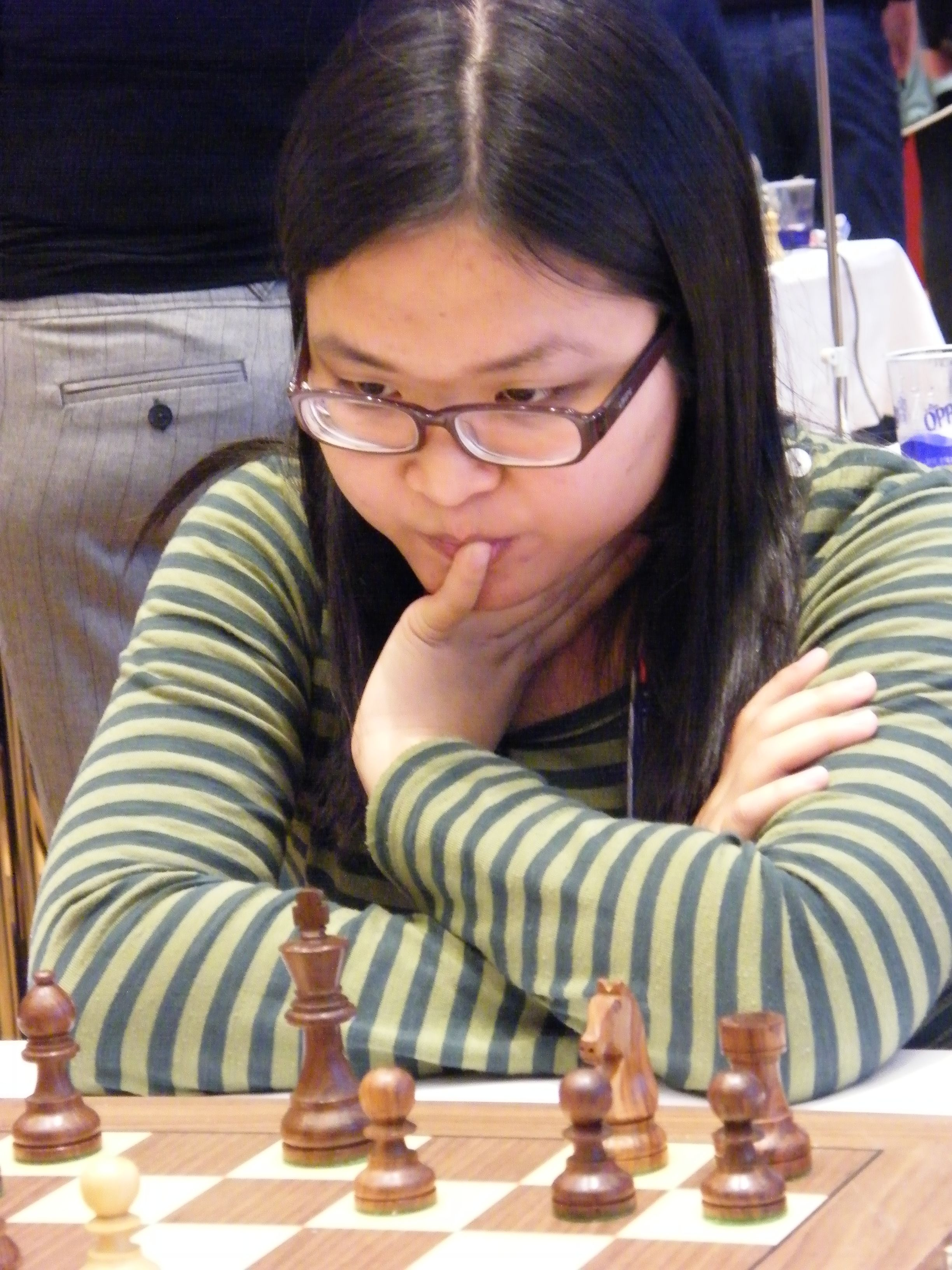
Giang Nguyen at the 38th Chess Olympiad in 2008 in Dresden

Nguyen is a senior lecturer in Applied Mathematics at the University of Adelaide, and a 2019 South Australian Tall Poppy Science Award recipient.
