= Parthasarathy Reddy =

Indian politician

Perla Parthasarathy Reddy is a Telugu Desam Party politician from Vemula (village & mondal) in Kadapa district in Andhra Pradesh.

An advocate by profession, he served as the chairman of the Pulivendula Market committee. In 2006, he was among 11 persons sentenced to life imprisonment in the murder of Y. S. Raja Reddy. .
