= Thiruvenkatachari Parthasarathy =

Indian mathematician (1940 - 2023)

- Born: February 29, 1940; Chennai, India
- Died: September 22, 2023 (aged 83); Chennai, India
- Education: Indian Statistical Institute, Kolkata
- Known for: Parthasarathy's theorem
- Awards: Shanti Swarup Bhatnagar Award
- Scientific career
- Fields: Mathematics, Game theory
- Doctoral advisor: C. R. (Calyampudi Radhakrishna) Rao

Thiruvenkatachari Parthasarathy (29 February 1940 - 22 September 2023), known and published as T. Parthasarathy, was an Indian game theorist and mathematician.

== Life and career ==
He co-authored a book on game theory with T. E. S. Raghavan, and two research monographs, one on optimization and one on univalence theory, published by Springer-Verlag. He was a former president of the Indian Mathematical Society.

He received his BSc and MSc degrees from University of Madras. He worked on the topic of "Minimax Theorems and Product solutions for simple games" under the guidance of C. R. Rao and received his PhD in 1967 from the Indian Statistical Institute, Kolkata. He delivered many lectures and seminars at University of Madras, Indian Statistical Institute, and Chennai Mathematical Institute. On the list of his scientific publication since 1965 there are more that 90 positions. He promoted PhDs students.

Parthasarathy received Shanti Swaroop Bhatnagar Award for Mathematical Sciences (1986). He was elected as Fellow of the Indian Academy of Sciences (1988) and Indian National Science Academy (1995).

He died on September 22, 2023, at the age of 83 at his Chennai residence.
