= Parta, Vršac =

Parta Парта
- Village (Selo)
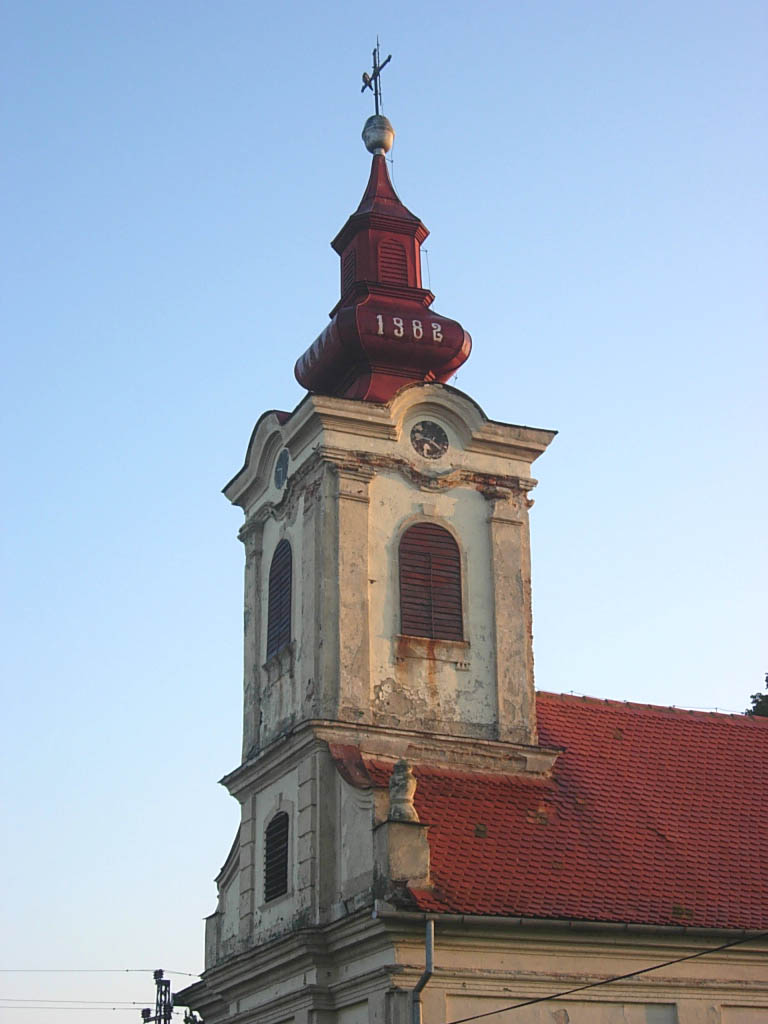
- The Orthodox Church

- Location of Parta within Serbia Parta (Serbia) Parta (Europe)
- Coordinates: 44°58′10″N 21°15′15″E
- Country: Serbia
- Province: Vojvodina
- District: South Banat
- Municipality: Vršac
- Elevation: 99 m (325 ft)

Population (2011)
  - Parta: 376
- Time zone: UTC+1 (CET)
  - Summer (DST): UTC+2 (CEST)
- Area code: +381(0)13
- Car plates: VŠ

Parta (Serbian Cyrillic: Парта; Hungarian: Párta) is a village in Serbia. It is situated in the Vršac municipality, in the South Banat District. The village has a Serb ethnic majority (95.49%) and its population numbers 376 people (2011 census).
