= T. E. S. Raghavan =

Indian-American mathematician (born 1940)

Tirukkannamangai Echambadi Srinivasa Raghavan
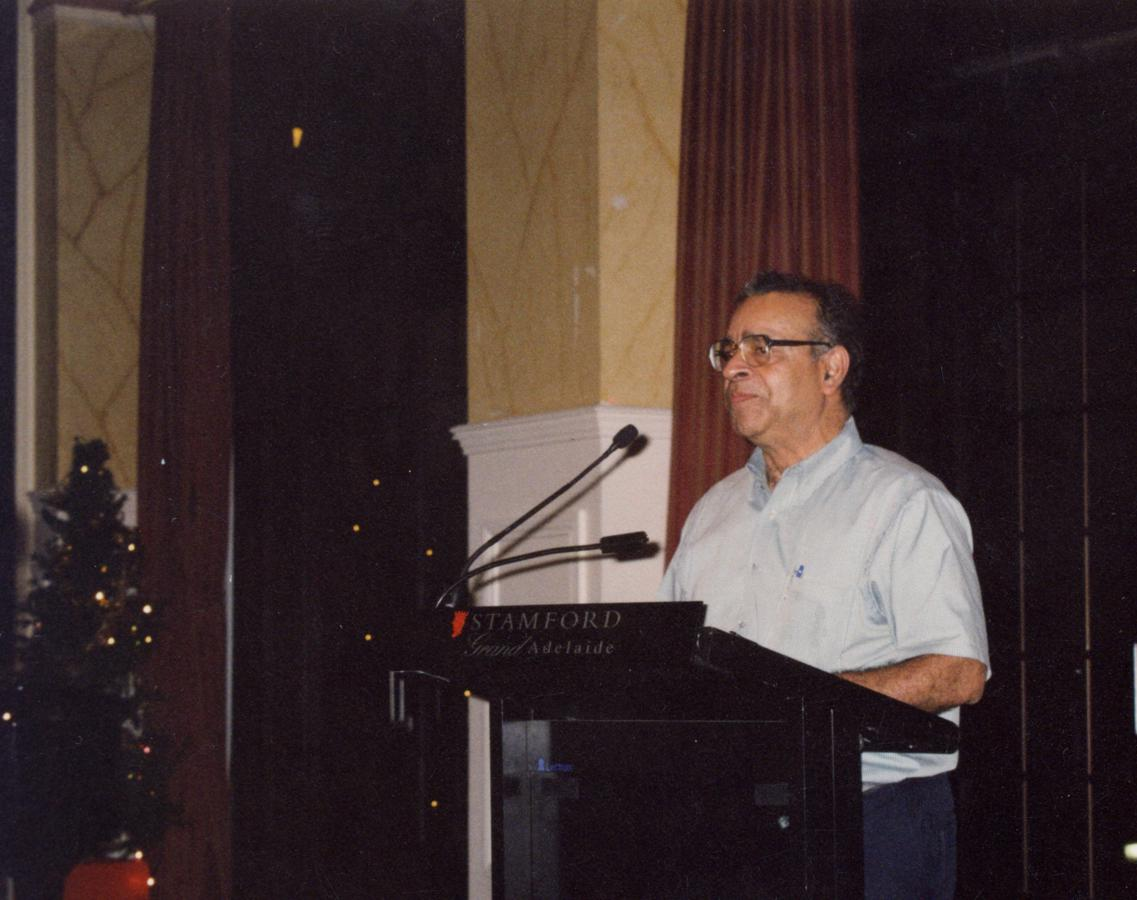
- T.E.S. Raghavan
- Born: September 1, 1940
- Education: Madras University; ISI Calcutta
- Known for: Existence theorems and finite arithmetic step solutions for structured stochastic and cooperative TU games
- Scientific career
- Fields: Mathematics, Game theory
- Doctoral advisor: C. R. (Calyampudi Radhakrishna) Rao

Tirukkannamangai Echambadi Srinivasa Raghavan (born on September 01, 1940) is an Indian-American mathematician and game theorist.

== Life and career ==
He holds the degree of M.Sc. in Statistics (Presidency College, Madras University) and received his Ph.D. in Mathematics and Statistics from ISI Calcutta in 1968 under the guidance of statistician Calyampudi Radhakrishna Rao based on his thesis: Extensions on the Theory of Positive Operators and Their Relationship to Minimax Games.

Raghavan’s interests are game theory, linear and non-linear programming, matrix theory, applied statistics, operations research. He made contributions to game theory, decision science, and special matrices are well known. He co-authored books on game theory with T. Parthasarathy, and the nonnegative matrices and their applications with R.B. Bapat. He contributed to the understanding of stochastic games and cooperative games. T.E.S. Raghavan organized 4 international conferences at UIC, the first on Stochastic games in honor of L.Shapley (1987), special Game Theory International Conferences at UIC in honor of Shapley(1991), Aumann (1994), Maschler (1996).

He published more than 60 research papers, 4 monographs, and guided 14 PhD students.

== Cultural engagement and educational initiatives ==
Being an ardent fan of Carnatic music, Raghavan has been actively involved in promoting the art form through the annual Chicago Tyagaraja Utsavam, which he helps organize in Chicago.

In line with the ancient Indian educational system, Raghavan also runs a Gurukulam (Sanskrit: गुरुकुलम्) in Game Theory in his native village of Pulavanur, Tamil Nadu. This Gurukulam was organized in collaboration with CARAMS, MAHE, Manipal, furthering its academic outreach and fostering interdisciplinary dialogue.
