= Vishwesha Tirtha =

Indian Hindu guru, saint and swamiji of the Sri Pejavara Adokshaja Matha (1931-2019)

His Holiness Śrī Śrī 1008 Vishwesha Tirtha Śrīpād
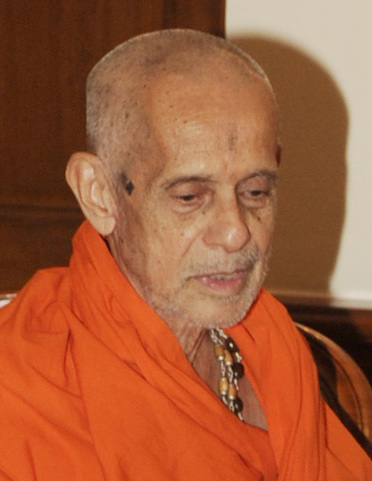
- Sri Sri Swamiji in 2014

Personal life
- Born: Venkataramana Bhat; 27 April 1931 Ramakunja
- Died: 29 December 2019 (aged 88) Pejawara Matha, Udupi
- Honors: Yathikula Chakravarthy

Religious life
- Religion: Hinduism
- Order: Vedanta (Pejawara Matha)
- Founder of: Poornaprajna Vidyapeetha
- Philosophy: Dvaita Vedanta

Religious career
- Teacher: Vidyamanya Tirtha
- Successor: Vishwaprasanna Tirtha
- Awards: Padma Vibhushan (2020) (posthumously)

Sri Vishwesha Tirtharu, officially known as Śrī Śrī 1008 Śrī Viśveśa-tīrtha Śrīpād Kannada: ಶ್ರೀ ಶ್ರೀ ೧೦೦೮ ಶ್ರೀ ವಿಶ್ವೇಶತೀರ್ಥ ಶ್ರೀಪಾದಂಗಳವರು (27 April 1931 – 29 December 2019), was an Indian Hindu guru, saint and presiding swamiji of the Sri Pejavara Adokshaja Matha, one of the Ashta Mathas belonging to the Dvaita school of philosophy founded by Sri Madhvacharya.

Sri Vishvesha Tirtharu was the 32nd in the lineage of the Pejawara Matha or Pejavara Mutt, starting from Sri Adhokshaja Tirtharu, who was one of the direct disciples of Sri Madhvacharya. He was the honorary president of Vishva Tulu Sammelana. He had established Poornaprajna Vidyapeetha in Bangalore which has completed over 63 years. Many scholars are trained here on Vedanta. He has also conducted 38 Nyayasudamangalas - graduations for Poornaprajna Vidyapeetha students. He was awarded the Padma Vibhushan India's second highest civilian award posthumously in 2020 for his work and service towards the society. Sri Vishvesha Tirtha was honored with Honorary Doctorate by Tumakuru University in 2010.

Road adjoining Dharwad Railway Station has been named in his honor.

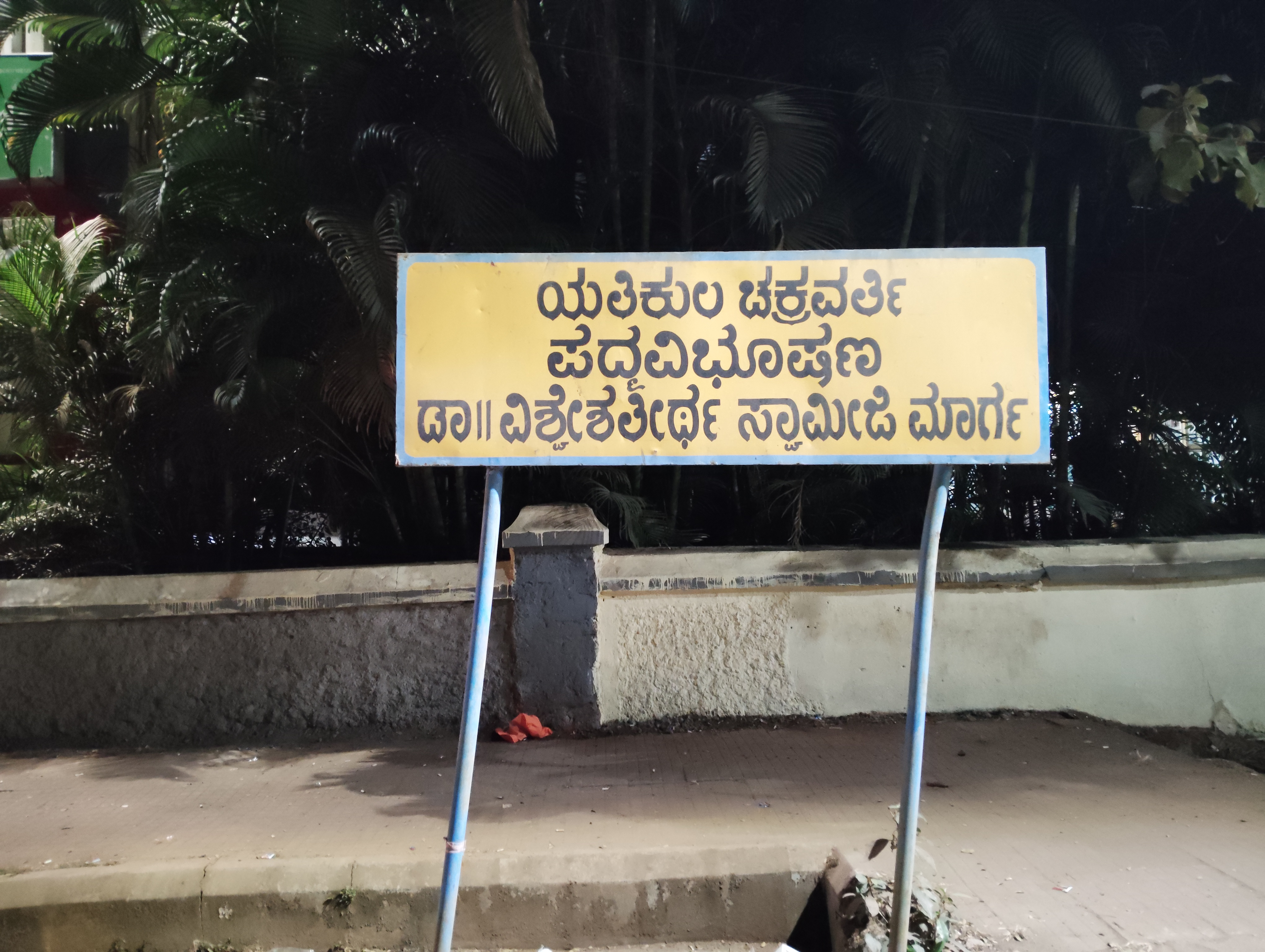
vishvesha teertha road Dharwad railway station

== See also ==
- Dvaita
- Works of Madhvacharya
