= Pejawara Matha =

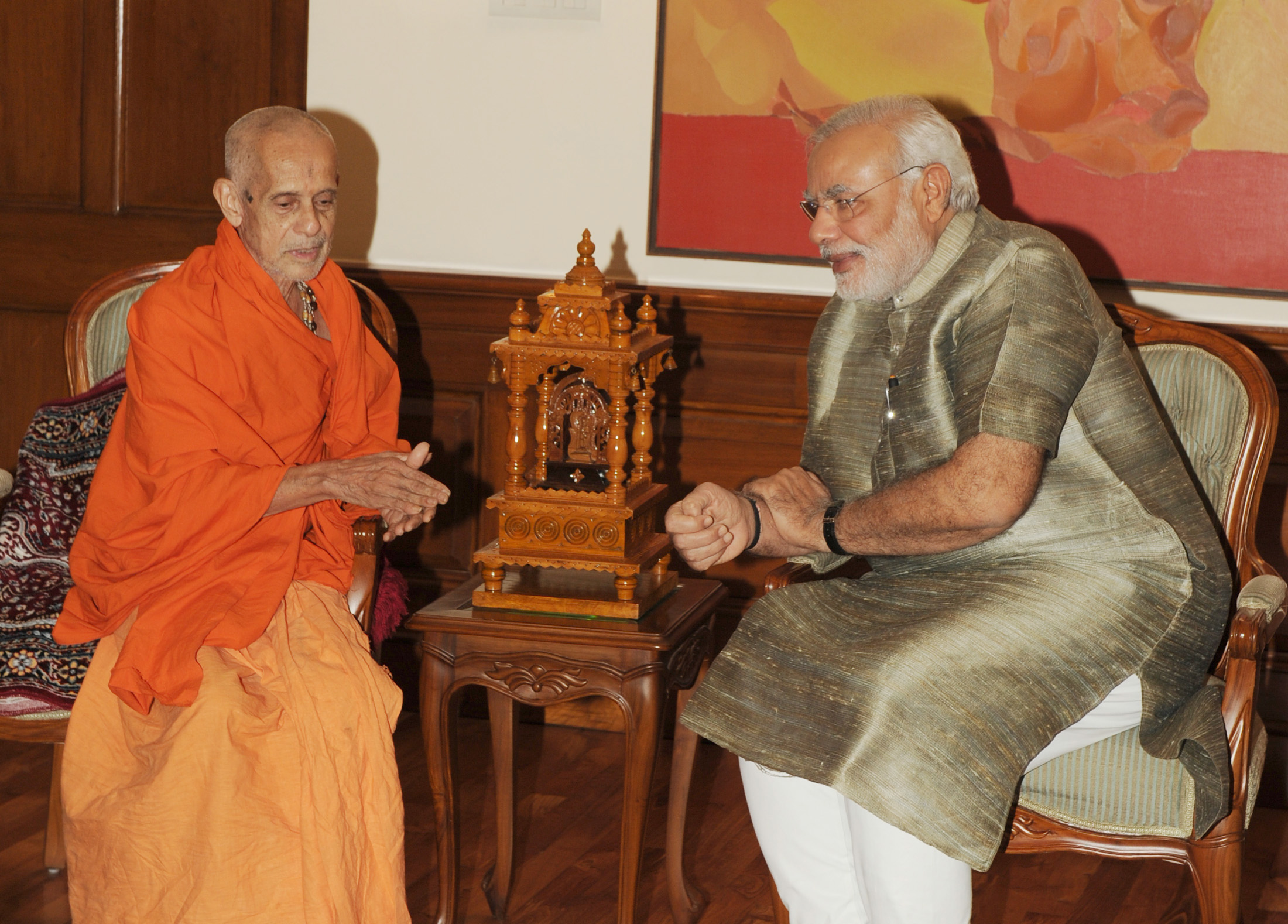
- H. H. Sri Sri Vishvesha Tirtha Swamiji with Indian prime minister Narendra Modi
- Country: India
- State: Karnataka
- District: Udupi

Pejavara Matha is one of the Ashta Mathas of Udupi, which was started by Sri Adhokshaja Tirtha, who was a direct disciple of Sri Madhvacharya, the founder of the Dvaita school of Hindu philosophy. Till date, 32 sanyasi pontiffs have headed this matha. The current presiding pontiff is Sri Vishwaprasanna Tirtha Swamiji. He ascended the Vedanta Peetha after the death of his predecessor and Guru H. H. Sri Sri Vishvesha Tirtha Swamiji on 29 December 2019. Moola (Main) Pejavara Matha (Pejawar Math) is located at Pejavara or Pejawara village in Mangaluru taluk, Dakshina Kannada (D.K) district of Karnataka state, India.

== The Lineage - Pejavara Guru Parampara ==
1. Madhvacharya (1238– ) (1199– )
2. Adhokshaja Teertha (1278–1296) (Dhanushkodi)
3. Kamalaksha Teertha (1296–1313) (Banks of River Ganga)
4. Pushkaraksha Teertha (1313–1335) (Banks of River Ganga)
5. Amarendra Teertha (1335–1359) (Moola Kaveri)
6. Mahendra Teertha (1359–1381) (Godavari)
7. Vijayadhvaja Teertha (1381–1410) (Kanva Tirtha)
8. Uttama Teertha (1410–1412)(???)
9. Chintamani Teertha (1412–1424)(Kanva Tirtha)
10. Damodara Teertha (1424–1457) (Udupi)
11. Vasudeva Teertha (1457–1475) (Banks of River Ganga)
12. Vadindra Teertha (1475–1482) (Moola Kaveri)
13. Vedagarbha Teertha (1482–1495) (Vrindavan)
14. Anuprajna Teertha (1495–1520) (Puri)
15. Vishvaprajna Teertha (1520–1537) (Nashik)
16. Vijaya Teertha (1537–1542) (Vrindavan)
17. Vishveshwara Teertha (1542–1552) (Proshti)
18. Vishvabhushana Teertha (1552–1603) (Ramanathapura, Hassan)
19. Vishvavandya Teertha (1603–1652) (Koodli)
20. Vidyaraja Teertha (1652–1678) (Srirangam)
21. Vishvamurthy Teertha (1678–1708) (Pejavara)
22. Vishvapati Teertha (1708–1736) (Banks of River Ganga)
23. Vishvanidhi Teertha (1736–1748) (Udupi)
24. Vishvadhisha Teertha (1748–1778) (Udupi)
25. Vishvadhiraja Teertha (1778–1814) (Udupi)
26. Vishvabodha Teertha (1814–1839) (Pejavara)
27. Vishvavallabha Teertha (1839–1864) (Mulbagal)
28. Vishvapriya Teertha (1864–1873) (Udupi/Pejavara)
29. Vishvavarya Teertha (1873–1875) (Peranankila)
30. Vishvaraja Teertha (1875–1880) (Peranankila)
31. Vishvamanohara Teertha (1880–1886) (Peranankila)
32. Vishvajna Teertha (1886–1919) (Udupi)
33. Vishvamanya Teertha (1919–1952) (Kanva Tirtha)
34. Vishvesha Teertha (1952–2019) attained Haripada at Udupi, Vrindavana at Poornaprajna Vidyapeetha, Bengaluru)
35. Vishwaprasanna Teertha (since 2019)

== See also ==
- Udupi Sri Krishna Matha
- Dvaita Vedanta
- Dvaita literature
