= Aralumallige Parthasarathy =

Indian writer

Aralumallige Parthsarathy (born 22 March 1948, Bangalore, India) is a scholar in the field of Dasa Sahitya
