= Sarathi (name of Krishna) =

Sanskrit term for charioteer

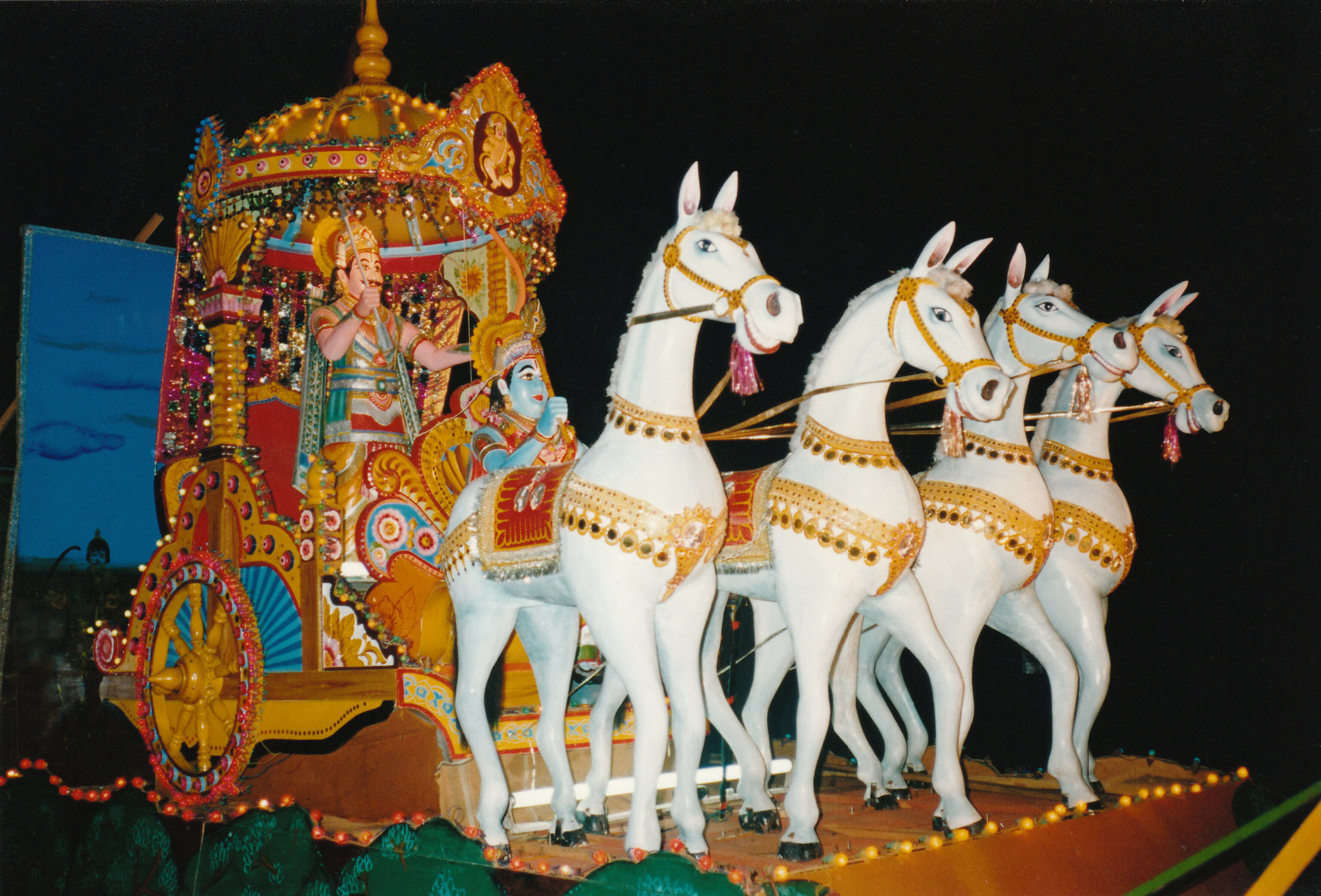
Krishna as the charioteer of Arjuna in a procession at Varkala, Kerala.

Sarathi (Sanskrit: सारथि, romanized: Sārathi, lit. 'charioteer', also anglicised as Sarathy) is an epithet of the Hindu deity Krishna used in the epic Mahabharata. Sarathy is also a common personal name in South India, mostly associated with Tamil Brahmins.

In the Mahabharata, Krishna initially counselled peace to the Pandavas and Kauravas, two closely related families that chose to fight over the Kuru kingdom in northern India. Eventually siding with the Pandavas, he offered his services as a charioteer to Arjuna, the Pandavas' greatest archer. Krishna is thus accorded the title Pārthasārathī, which translates to "charioteer of Partha" (another name for Arjuna), or Sanātana Sārathi "eternal charioteer". The Bhagavad Gita, considered by many traditions to be Hinduism's most important religious text, consists of a dialogue between Krishna, the charioteer, and Arjuna just before the actual battle begins, where Krishna instructs Arjuna in the principle of dharma in response to his hesitation to fighting against his own relatives.

== Symbolism ==
In Hinduism, as aligned with Plato's philosophy, the dynamic interaction of persons, horses, and parts are "yoked," "reined," and "bound" together, serving as an allegory for the atman or "self", and its relationship to the senses and the body.

"Know the Self as the lord of the chariot (atmanam rathinam viddhi) and the body as, verily, the chariot, know the intellect as the charioteer (buddhim tu saradhim viddhi) and the mind (manas) as, verily, the reins. The senses, they say, are the horses.... He who has understanding for the driver of the chariot (vinyanasarathir) and controls the rein of his mind, he reaches the end of the journey, the supreme abode of the all-pervading."

— Katha Upanisad, 1.3.3-4

In the Stri Parva of the Mahabharata, Vidura explains the concept of samsara to his grieving brother Dhritarashtra by offering the metaphor of a chariot and a charioteer.

The body of creatures is a chariot; sattva they call the charioteer; the senses, they call horses; the mental organ of action (karmabuddhi) is the reins. Whoever follows after the rush of those running steeds, he turns about like a wheel in the cycle of samsara. Whoever restrains them with understanding (buddhi), that restrainer/charioteer (yantr) does not return. This chariot, by which the unwise are bewildered, must be controlled ....Restraint, renunciation, and vigilance (damastyago pramadasca), these three are the horses of Brahman. Whoever is firm in this spiritual chariot (manase rathi), and yoked (to those steeds) with the reins of morality, having renounced the fear of death, O king, he attains to the world of Brahman.

— Veda Vyasa, Stri Parva, Mahabharata, (11.4.1, 5.1)
