= N. Ram =

Indian journalist (born 1945)

N Ram
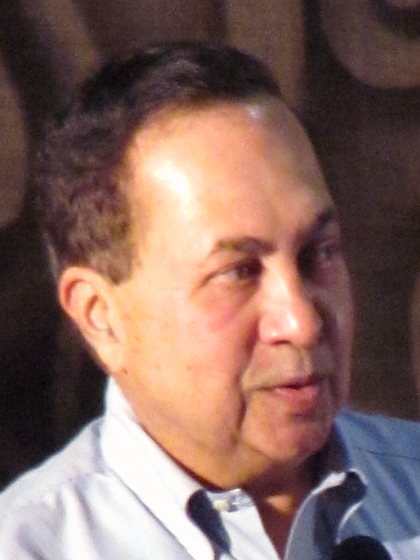
- N Ram at a public function in New Delhi
- Born: 4 May 1945 (age 81)
- Education: Loyola College, Chennai; Presidency College, Chennai; Columbia University
- Occupations: Chairman of Kasturi & Sons Ltd. & publisher of The Hindu (2013 – incumbent) managing director of The Hindu Group (1977–2003); Editor of Frontline and Sportstar (1991–2003); Editor-in-Chief of The Hindu Group (2003–2012)
- Known for: Journalism, Newspapering, exposing Bofors scandal (1989)
- Board member of: The Hindu Group (2012 – present)
- Children: 1
- Parent: G. Narasimhan
- Relatives: N. Murali (brother); N. Ravi (brother); Malini Parthasarathy
- Awards: Raja Ram Mohan Roy Award (2018); Asian Investigative Journalist of the Year (1990); JRD Tata Award for Business Ethics (2003); Sri Lanka Rathna Award (2005)

Narasimhan Ram (born 4 May 1945) is an Indian journalist and a prominent member of the Kasturi family that controls The Hindu Group of publications. Ram was the managing-director of The Hindu since 1977 and its editor-in-chief since 27 June 2003 until 18 January 2012. Ram also headed the other publications of The Hindu Group such as Frontline, The Hindu Business Line and Sportstar, and has been awarded the Padma Bhushan by the Government of India and Sri Lanka Ratna by the Government of Sri Lanka.

Subsequent to changes in the editorial & business sections of The Hindu on 21 October 2013, Ram has become chairman of Kasturi & Sons Limited and publisher of The Hindu.

== Early life and education ==
Ram was born on 4 May 1945 in Madras, British India. He was the eldest son of G. Narasimhan who served as managing-director of The Hindu from 1959 to 1977. Ram is a great-grandson of S. Kasturi Ranga Iyengar, the patriarch of the Kasturi family that owns The Hindu.

Ram did his schooling at Madras Christian College Higher Secondary School in Chennai. He graduated from Loyola College, with a bachelor's degree in arts in 1964, received a master's degree from Presidency College in 1966, and later an M.S. in comparative journalism from the Columbia University Graduate School of Journalism.

In college, Ram was active in students politics. He was vice-president of the Students Federation of India (SFI), which is politically linked to the Communist Party of India (Marxist) (CPM), when it was founded in 1970. Ram was close friends with Prakash Karat, later the chief of CPM. Ram is also said to be a "card-carrying" member of CPM.

== Journalism and career ==
Ram began his career in The Hindu in 1977 under the editorship of his uncle G. Kasturi. He served as an associate editor of the newspaper till the retirement of Kasturi in 1991. In between, he served as the Washington correspondent for two years, 1980–1982.

Ram became famous as a journalist with his exposé of the Bofors Scandal during the reign of former prime minister of India Rajiv Gandhi. Despite tremendous pressure from the Rajiv Gandhi administration to stop the Bofors series, he refused to cave in. This brought him in loggerheads with G. Kasturi as well as the other members of the Kasturi family. As a result, when Kasturi stepped down in 1991, Ram's younger brother N. Ravi was brought in as the editor of The Hindu and Ram was "shunted out" to Frontline, the fortnightly magazine of The Hindu Group.

Prior to his position as the editor-in-chief of The Hindu, Ram had served as the editor of Frontline magazine and Sportstar between 1991 and 2003.

Towards the end of a bitter family feud, Ram stepped down as editor-in-chief and publisher of The Hindu group on 19 January 2012. Siddharth Varadarajan, editor of The Hindu, succeeded him, with effect from 19 January 2012, as editor of The Hindu responsible for the selection of news under the Press and Registration of Books (PRB) Act of 1867. D. Sampathkumar, editor, Business Line, R. Vijaya Sankar, editor, Frontline, and Nirmal Shekar, editor, Sportstar, took over, with effect from 19 January 2012, as editors responsible for the selection of news under the Press and Registration of Books (PRB) Act of 1867 in these Group publications. K. Balaji, managing director of Kasturi & Sons Ltd., the public limited company that brings out The Hindu group of publications, succeeded Mr. Ram as publisher of all the group publications. Subsequent to changes in the Editorial & Business of The Hindu on 21 October 2013, Ram has become chairman of Kasturi & Sons Limited and publisher of The Hindu and group publications.

During his younger days, Ram also started a journal called Radical Review, with his friends, P. Chidambaram and Prakash Karat.

=== Awards and recognition ===
Ram's contribution to journalism has been recognised by a number of awards. These include the Asian Investigative Journalist of the Year (1990) Award conferred by the Press Foundation of Asia at the "One Asia Assembly", Bofors Case, the disciplined application of his journalistic idealism and the impact of his revelations on the Indian political scene"; the B.D. Goenka, 1989, shared with Chitra Subramaniam; in the interest of the nation"; and XLRI's First JRD Tata Award for Business Ethics, awarded at the institute's 46th Annual Convocation at Jamshedpur on 23 March 2003. The Highest national honour conferred by Sri Lanka on non–nationals is the Sri Lanka Rathna award. Ram, the editor in chief of four Chennai-based publications, became the first Indian national to be awarded that honour on 14 November 2005.

Ram has been chosen for the prestigious Raja Ram Mohan Roy Award, presented by the Press Council of India, for his outstanding contribution towards journalism, the Councils announced on 5 November 2018. The award was presented on 16 November on the occasion of the National Press Day.

=== Controversies ===
On 25 January 2012, Mr. K.C. Palaniswamy a former AIADMK Member of Parliament registered a complaint against Ram and eight others with the Chennai police, accusing them of a 400-acre land grab scam, worth nearly ₹3 billion. Ram filed and received an anticipatory bail in the case.

In 2012, shortly after Ram was honoured by his alma mater, the Graduate School of Journalism at Columbia University, Chitra Subramaniam alleged that he was responsible for compromising the identity of their source on the Bofors story and that she had not received her due as the journalist who broke the story. Ram denied the allegations.

== Personal life ==
Ram's first wife Susan was an English woman who came to India as a research student. Like Ram, she was (and remains) an atheist with a Leftist perspective on politics. After their marriage, Susan worked as a teacher, a freelance journalist, an editor for Oxford University Press publications in India and a television presenter. As a husband and wife team, they published the first volume of a biography on R. K. Narayan, the eminent Indian writer.

Ram and Susan's daughter, Vidya Ram, became a journalist and graduated at the top of the class at her father's alma mater. She also won a Pulitzer fellowship, was an intern at The New York Times, a reporter at Forbes and is the European Correspondent at Business Line.

After the divorce from Susan, Ram married Mariam Chandy, a Malayali Christian. It was Mariam's second marriage as well. Mariam comes from a prosperous family that owned the now defunct Travancore National and Quilon Bank, liquidated in 1938. She has worked in advertising agencies, HTA and O&M. Mariam Ram is presently the managing director of TNQ Books and Journals, that she founded in Chennai in 1998. The company does editing, pagination and design for scientific, technical and medical publishers of the US, the UK and the European Union. As of 2008, the company had an annual turnover of ₹50 crores and employs 1200 staff.

During his youth, Ram played cricket and was the wicket-keeper batsman for the Tamil Nadu state team in the Ranji trophy.
