= Kamadhenu (disambiguation) =

Kamadhenu is a divine cow in Hindu mythology.

Kamadhenu may also refer to:

- Kamadhenu (film), a 1941 Indian Tamil-language film
- Kamadhenu (magazine), a weekly Indian magazine published in Tamil by The Hindu Group
- Kamadhenu (Dharwad), a village in the southern state of Karnataka, India
- Kamdhenu University, an agriculatural university in Gujarat, India
- Kamdhenu Yojna, a dairy scheme of the government of Uttar Pradesh, India under the National Dairy Development Board

== See also ==
- Surabhi (disambiguation)
