= Surabhi (disambiguation) =

Surabhi (Kamadhenu) is a divine bovine-goddess described in Hinduism as the mother of all cows.

Surabhi, Surbhi or Shurbhi may also refer to:

== People ==
- Surabhi Dashputra, Hindi singer
- Surabhi Kamalabai (1913–1977), Telugu film actress
- Surabhi Lakshmi (born 1986), Malayalam film actress
- Surabhi Santhosh, Kannada film actress
- Surbhi Puranik, Tamil and Telugu film actress
- Surbhi Javeri Vyas, Hindi television actress
- Surbhi Jyoti (born 1988), Hindi television actress
- Surbhi Tiwari (born 1981), Hindi television actress
- Surbhi Chandna, Hindi television actress

== Arts and media ==
- Surabhi (film), a 1999 documentary film produced by K. N. T. Sastry
- Surabhi (theatre group), a family theatre group in Hyderabad, Telangana, India
- Surabhi (TV series), an Indian cultural magazine show

== Other uses ==
- Surabhi foundation, an organisation supporting farmers and artisans in rural India
- Surabhi Village, Kadapa District, Andhra Pradesh, India

== See also ==
- Kamadhenu (disambiguation)
