= Gita Siddharth =

Indian actress and social worker (died 2019)

- Born: 7 August 1950
- Died: 14 December 2019 (aged 69)
- Occupations: Actress, Social Worker
- Years active: 1972–2019
- Spouse: Siddharth Kak
- Children: Antara Kak

Gita Siddharth (7 August 1950 – 14 December 2019) was an Indian actress and social worker. She acted in mainstream Bollywood as well as art cinema, like Parichay (1972), Garm Hava (1973), and Gaman (1978).

She was best known for her role in M.S. Sathyu's Garm Hava (1973), at the 21st National Film Awards, where the film won the award for Best Feature Film on National Integration, and she received a souvenir as the lead actress.

She was married to documentary maker, television producer, and presenter, Siddharth Kak, most known for his cultural magazine show, Surabhi in the 1990s. Their daughter Antara Kak is a documentary filmmaker. Gita was also an art director with the show. She died on 14 December 2019.

== Selected filmography ==
- Parichay (1972)
- Garm Hava (1973)
- Sholay (1975)
- Doosra Aadmi (1977)
- Gaman (1978)
- Trishul (1978)
- Noorie (1979)
- Sadgati (1981)
- Ladaaku (1981)
- Shoukheeen (1982)
- Suraag (1982)
- Desh Premee (1982)
- Arth (1982)
- Disco Dancer (1982)
- Mandi (1983)
- Nishaan (1983)
- Kasam Paida Karne Wale Ki (1984)
- Zabardast (1985)
- Ram Teri Ganga Maili (1985)
- Alag Alag (1985)
- Ilzaam (1986)
- Ek Chadar Maili Si (1986)
- Ek Aur Sikander (1986)
- Nazrana (1987 film)
- Dance Dance (1987)
- Paap Ki Duniya (1988)
- Paap Ko Jalaa Kar Raakh Kar Doonga (1988)
- Farz Ki Jung (1989)
- Insaaf Apne Lahoo Se (1994)
