= Muthusamy =

- Senuran Muthusamy South African cricketer
- Muthusamy Varadarajan Indian civil servant
