= Rajdeep Sardesai =

Indian news anchor and author

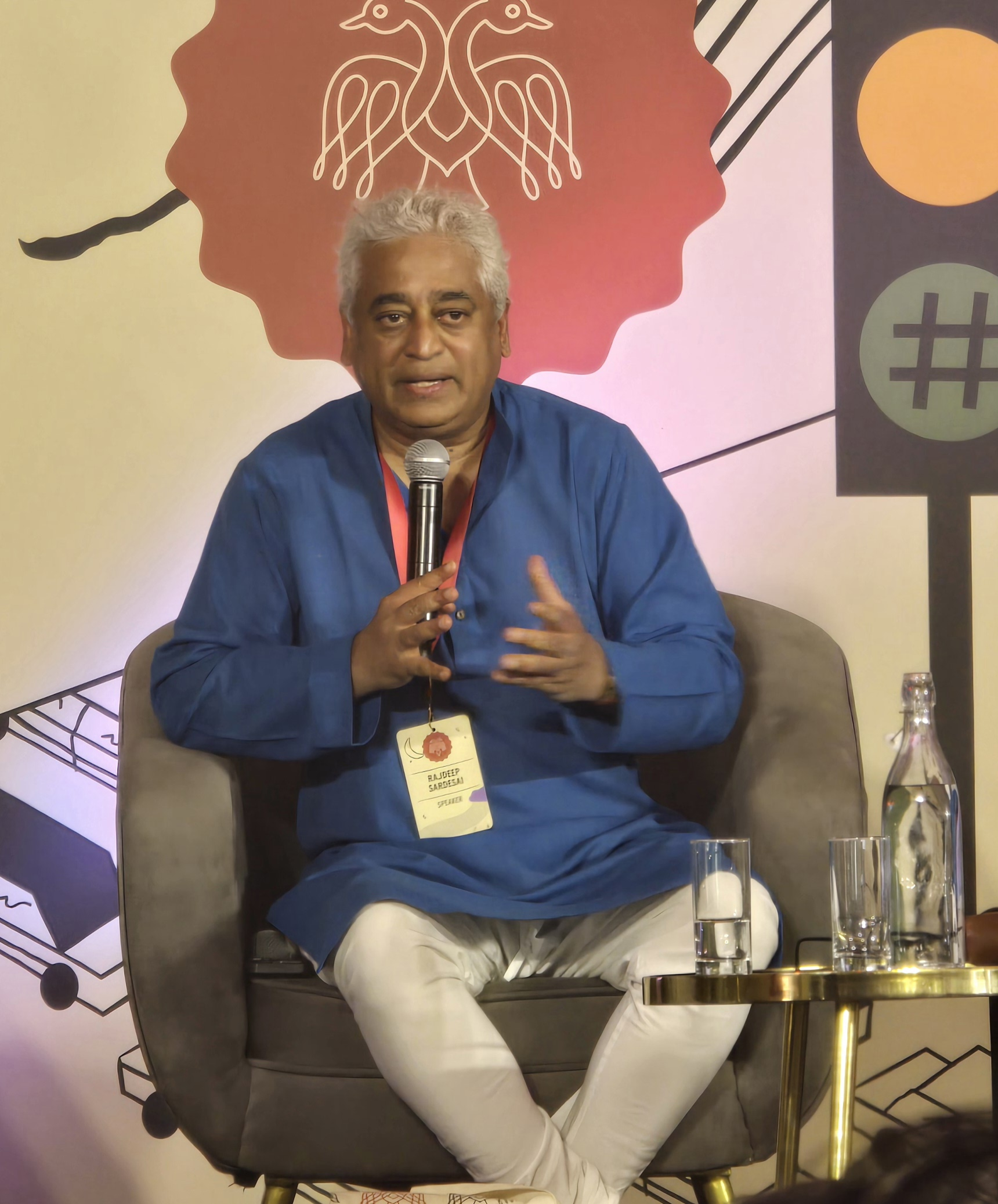
- Sardesai at BlrLitFest 2024
- Born: Rajdeep Dilip Sardesai; 24 May 1965 (age 61); Ahmedabad, Gujarat, India
- Education: St. Xavier's College, Mumbai (B.A.); University College, Oxford (M.A., BCL)
- Occupations: Journalist; News presenter
- Employer: India Today Group
- Spouse: Sagarika Ghose (m. 1994)
- Children: 2
- Father: Dilip Sardesai
- Relatives: Bhaskar Ghose (father-in-law)
- Honours: Padma Shri

Rajdeep Sardesai (born 24 May 1965) is an Indian journalist, news anchor, reporter and author. He is a consulting editor and anchor of India Today. He was the Editor-in-Chief of TV18, that included CNN-News18, News18 India and News18 Marathi, before resigning in July 2014.

== Early life ==
Sardesai was born in Ahmedabad, Gujarat, to a Goan father and a Gujarati mother. His father, Dilip Sardesai, was a former Indian Test cricketer and his mother, Nandini, is an activist in Mumbai and former head of the Department of Sociology at St. Xavier's College, Mumbai. He completed his schooling up to ICSE from the Campion School, Mumbai, and did two years of ISC at Cathedral and John Connon School, Mumbai. Thereafter he graduated in economics from St. Xavier's College, Mumbai. He then went to University College, Oxford, earning the degrees of Bachelor of Arts in jurisprudence (promoted to Master of Arts by seniority) and Bachelor of Civil Law.

While at Oxford he made six first-class cricket appearances for Oxford University and one for a combined Oxford and Cambridge side against the 1987 Pakistani touring team. He was awarded a cricket Blue at Oxford.

== Career ==
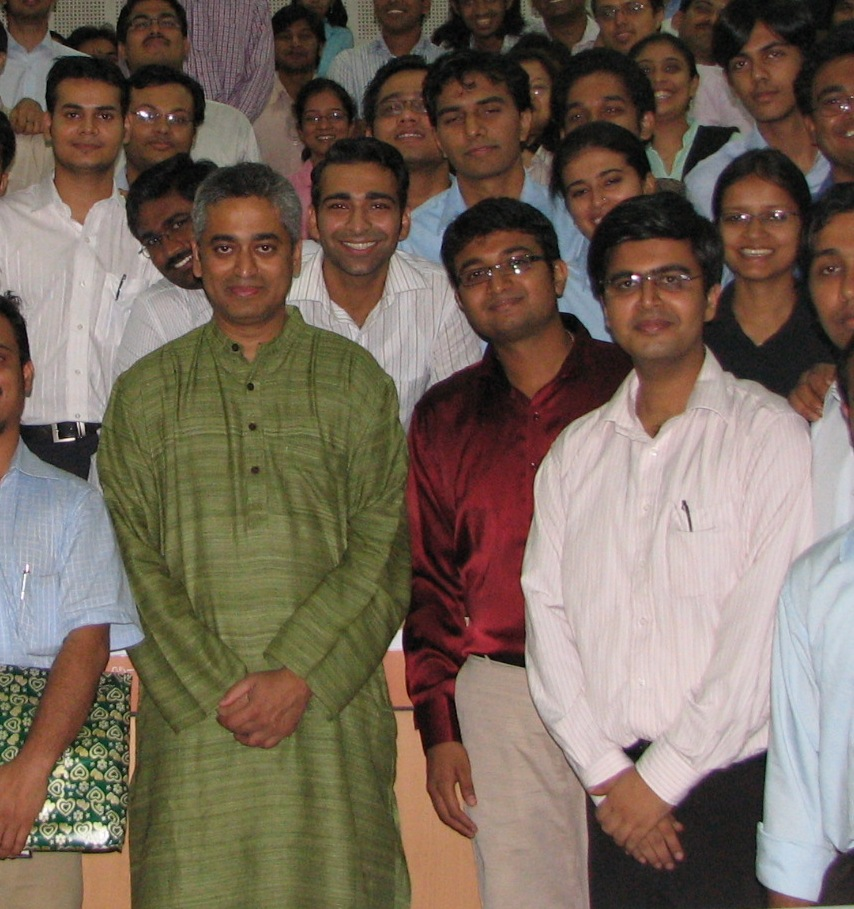
Sardesai at IIM in 2008

Sardesai worked with The Times of India for six years, after joining it in October 1988, and was the city editor of its Mumbai edition. He entered television journalism in 1994 as political editor of New Delhi Television (NDTV). He was the Managing Editor of both NDTV 24X7 and NDTV India and was responsible for overseeing the news policy for both. He hosted popular shows like The Big Fight at NDTV.

He quit NDTV on 17 April 2005 to start his own company, Global Broadcast News (GBN), in collaboration with the American giant CNN and Raghav Bahl's TV18. The latter broadcasts the Indian Edition (in English) of CNBC called CNBC-TV18, the Hindi consumer channel, CNBC Awaaz and an international channel, SAW. The new channel with Sardesai as the Editor-in-Chief was named CNN-IBN. It went on air on 17 December 2005. Channel 7 has also come under this umbrella after Sardesai's company bought a 46 per cent stake in the channel. Channel 7 was later renamed IBN7.

On 29 May 2014, Reliance Industries announced it would be acquiring control in Network 18 Media & Investments Ltd, the parent of CNN-IBN, IBN7 and CNBC-TV18. The board of RIL approved funding of up to ₹40 billion (US$420 million) to Independent Media Trust (IMT), of which RIL is the sole beneficiary, for acquisition of control in Network 18 and its subsidiaries. Subsequently, on 1 July 2014, Sardesai, editor-in-chief of CNN-IBN, along with the entire founding team — editorial and managerial — resigned from the Network18 Group.

In May 2026, he was a featured panelist at the 10th anniversary of the 'Talk Journalism' panel held in London. Talking on the role of the press in any democracy, he said that "journalists have to be like cockroaches...because god fobid if a nuclear blast destroys the world, they have to (still, eventually) report on it", alluding to the then recent rise of the political pressure group Cockroach Janta Party in India.

He is a consulting editor with the India Today Group and anchors a prime time show on India Today since 2014.

== Personal life ==
He is married to journalist, author, and Trinamool Congress leader Sagarika Ghose. Sardesai and Ghose have two children, son Ishan who is an ENT surgeon, and daughter Tarini.

== Controversies and Legal issues ==
Sardesai and others were acquitted of defamation by a Hyderabad court in November 2019 after issuing an unconditional apology to IPS officer Rajiv Trivedi for false reporting on his role in the death of Sohrabuddin Sheikh.

In January 2021, Sardesai was taken off TV for two weeks by India Today while also cutting his monthly salary for alleging in a retracted tweet that Navreet Singh was killed in a police shooting during 2020–2021 Indian farmers' protest. Delhi Police claimed that his tweet on the cause of death was not accurate and referred to the CCTV footage of the incident of Singh's death. Later, Sardesai was booked for sedition over the Republic Day violence and the FIR stated that they shared misinformed news and ‘instigated violence’ on 26 January. Several journalists and politicians who reported about the 2021 Indian farmers' Republic Day protest were charged with sedition by the Delhi police and 5 BJP-ruled state police. Siddharth Varadarajan called the police FIRs "malicious prosecution". Press Club of India (PCI), the Editors’ Guild of India, the Press Association, the Indian Women's Press Corps (IWPC), the Delhi Union of Journalists and the Indian Journalists Union in a joint press conference asked the sedition law to be scrapped. Editors Guild of India spoke against invoking of the sedition charge on journalists. The guild termed the FIRs as an "attempt to intimidate, harass, browbeat and stifle the media".

In July 2024, Rajdeep Sardesai posted a video clip on X claiming that BJP spokesperson Shazia Ilmi had abused his cameraperson after his debate show. She subsequently filed a defamation suit in the Delhi High Court against Sardesai. Shazia Ilmi responded, stating, "The show was over, my consent was over. Thereafter, I can't be continuously recorded in my private space without my consent." Delhi High Court opined that the video was recorded by India Today cameraperson after Ilmi had removed herself from the show. The court ordered Rajdeep Sardesai to immediately remove the video, take down the post and remarked, "You had no authority to record and no authority to use." On 5 April, Delhi High Court imposed a fine of Rs. 25,000 on Ilmi for hiding facts with regards to her allegations against Sardesai.

Sardesai and American right-wing activist Laura Loomer had a brazen confrontation at the India Today Conclave in New Delhi in March 2026, with Sardesai blaming Loomer of anti-India and Islamophobic remarks, and Loomer retorting back sharply.

== Awards ==
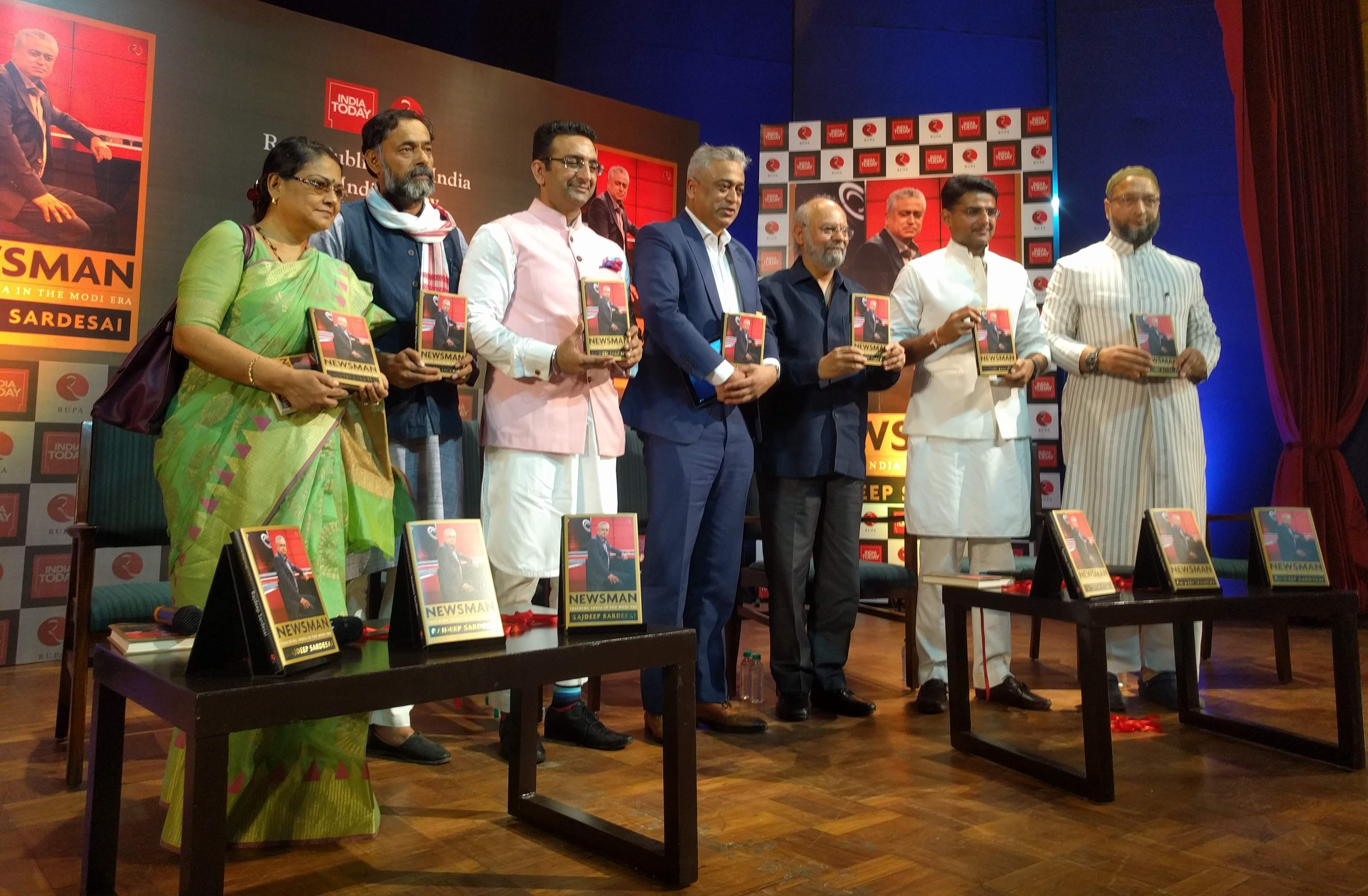
Rajdeep Sardesai (center) during the book launch of his book Newsman at Teen Murti Bhavan. (L-R) Kakoli Ghosh Dastidar, Yogendra Yadav, Gaurav Bhatia, Naresh Gujral, Sachin Pilot and Asadudin Owaisi.

- The Padma Shri, awarded by the Govt of India, in 2008
- The International Broadcasters award for coverage of the 2002 Gujarat riots and the Ramnath Goenka Excellence in Journalism award for 2006
- In ENBA award 2020 Rajdeep Sardesai received lifetime achievement award.

== Books ==
- 2024: The Election that Surprised India, released on 8 November 2024
- 2019: How Modi Won India
- Newsman: Tracking India in the Modi Era, published by Rupa Publications India, 6 August 2018
- 2014: The Election that Changed India, released on 1 November 2014
- Democracy's XI: The Great Indian Cricket Story, published by Juggernaut Books
- Co-authored chapter "The Truth Hurts: Gujarat and the Role of the Media" in the book Gujarat: The Making of a Tragedy, edited by Siddharth Varadarajan and published by Penguin (ISBN 978-0143029014). The book is about the 2002 Gujarat riots.
- Real Heroes: Ordinary People Extraordinary Service, co-authored with Nita Ambani
