= Antara Kak =

Indian film director

- Occupations: Film director Film producer
- Years active: 2002–present
- Parent(s): Siddharth Kak; Gita Siddharth

Antara Kak is an Indian film director and producer, predominantly based in India. She is daughter of Siddharth Kak (of Surabhi fame) and his wife, Gita Siddharth. Antara won acclaim and an award for her debut venture: A Life in Dance - Daksha Sheth.

== Early life and background ==
Antara studied English literature at Mithibai College.

== Career ==
Antara Kak began her career as an assistant director, assisting her father Siddharth Kak. She worked as an assistant director working primarily on non-fiction shows and documentaries. She spent eight years working on the program Surabhi, which was produced by her father, Siddharth Kak. She went on to direct the documentary A Life in Dance which earned her the debut director award from the Indian Documentary Producers Association. Kak was also the creative director for Mano Ya Na Mano on the former channel Star One as well as the supernatural thriller Sambhav Kya on 9X.

== Filmography ==
Year	Film	Director	Producer	Writer	Notes
2002	A Life in Dance-Daksha Sheth	Yes	Yes		Won IDPA (Indian Documentary Producers Association) award for the debutant director
2006	Mano Ya Na Mano	Yes			
