= Siddharth Varadarajan =

American journalist

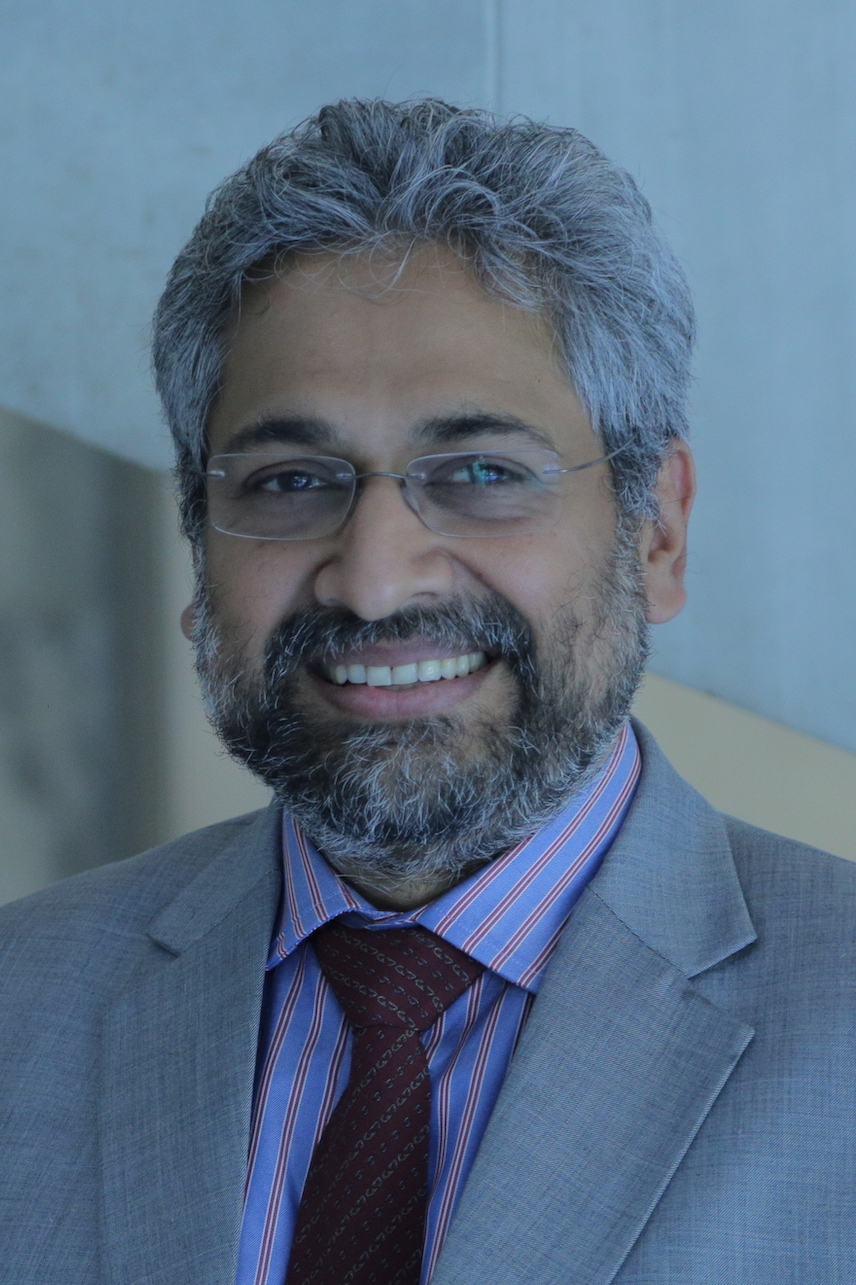
- Varadarajan in 2014
- Born: 10 April 1965 (age 61)
- Citizenship: United States
- Education: London School of Economics; Columbia University
- Occupation: Journalist
- Title: Founding Editor of The Wire; Former Editor of The Hindu
- Spouse: Nandini Sundar
- Parents: Muthusamy Varadarajan (father); Usha Varadarajan (mother)
- Relatives: Tunku Varadarajan (brother)
- Awards: Shorenstein Journalism Award; Bernardo O'Higgins Order; Elizabeth Neuffer Memorial Prize; Ramnath Goenka Memorial Award for Journalist of the Year; Deutsche Welle Freedom of Speech Award; Red Ink Award; El Mundo Journalism Award
- Website: svaradarajan.com

Siddharth Varadarajan (born 10 April 1965) is an American citizen, journalist and editor based in India. He was editor of the English-language national daily The Hindu from 2011 to 2013. He is one of the founding editors of the Indian digital news portal The Wire, along with Sidharth Bhatia and M. K. Venu.

Siddharth Varadarajan has faced several legal cases over reports published by The Wire, including proceedings related to Ayodhya, Rampur, Barabanki and the 2022 Meta/Malviya controversy.

== Early life, education and activism ==
Siddharth Varadarajan was born to an IAS officer, Muthusamy Varadarajan, and Usha, a businesswoman. He did his initial schooling at La Martiniere in Lucknow and Mayo College, Ajmer.

After 1978, Siddharth Varadarajan studied at the Brockley County state school in London, his father having been appointed to a position at the Indian High Commission in London. He received an undergraduate degree in economics at the London School of Economics where he was exposed to the Left-wing politics in the UK, which came to influence his journalistic career. He then studied at Columbia University. While a student at Columbia, he met his future wife, Nandini Sundar.

== Career ==
=== Media ===
==== Times of India ====
In 1995, Siddharth Vardarajan returned to India to work as a journalist, before joining The Times of India as an editorial writer in 1995.

==== The Hindu ====
In May 2011, Siddharth Varadarajan was appointed as The Hindu's editor via an extraordinary general meeting called by the Board of Directors. He was the first editor to have been not drawn from the family of primary shareholders in its 150-year history.

On 21 October 2013, Siddharth Varadarajan publicly announced his resignation from The Hindu, citing a change in policy by the owners of the newspaper to go back to being a family-run-and-edited newspaper. The Hindu on its website reported defiance of code of editorial values by Varadarajan. N. Ravi who took over as the editor-in-chief of The Hindu alleged that one of the reasons for Siddharth Varadarajan's exit was his anti-Modi bias.

During Siddharth Vardarajan's tenure as the editor, Bharatiya Janata Party (BJP) leader Subramanian Swamy filed a case in Delhi's High Court challenging his appointment as editor on the grounds that Varadarajan was not an Indian citizen, and further complained to the Ministry of Information and Broadcasting, Government of India. The petition was ultimately denied by the Delhi High Court. Varadarajan later claimed in an interview to Tehelka that Swamy had demanded more coverage in The Hindu of his statements through an intermediary, and that the court case was a mode of exacting revenge after Vardarajan rebuffed Swami.

==== The Wire ====
In 2015, Siddharth Varadarajan along with Sidharth Bhatia and M. K. Venu founded the non-profit online news portal called The Wire.

=== Academic positions ===
In 2007, Siddharth Varadarajan was a visiting professor at the Graduate School of Journalism, University of California, Berkeley. In 2009, he was a Poynter Fellow at Yale University. He has also served as a senior fellow at the Center for Public Affairs and Critical Theory at Shiv Nadar University in Delhi.

=== Other affiliations ===
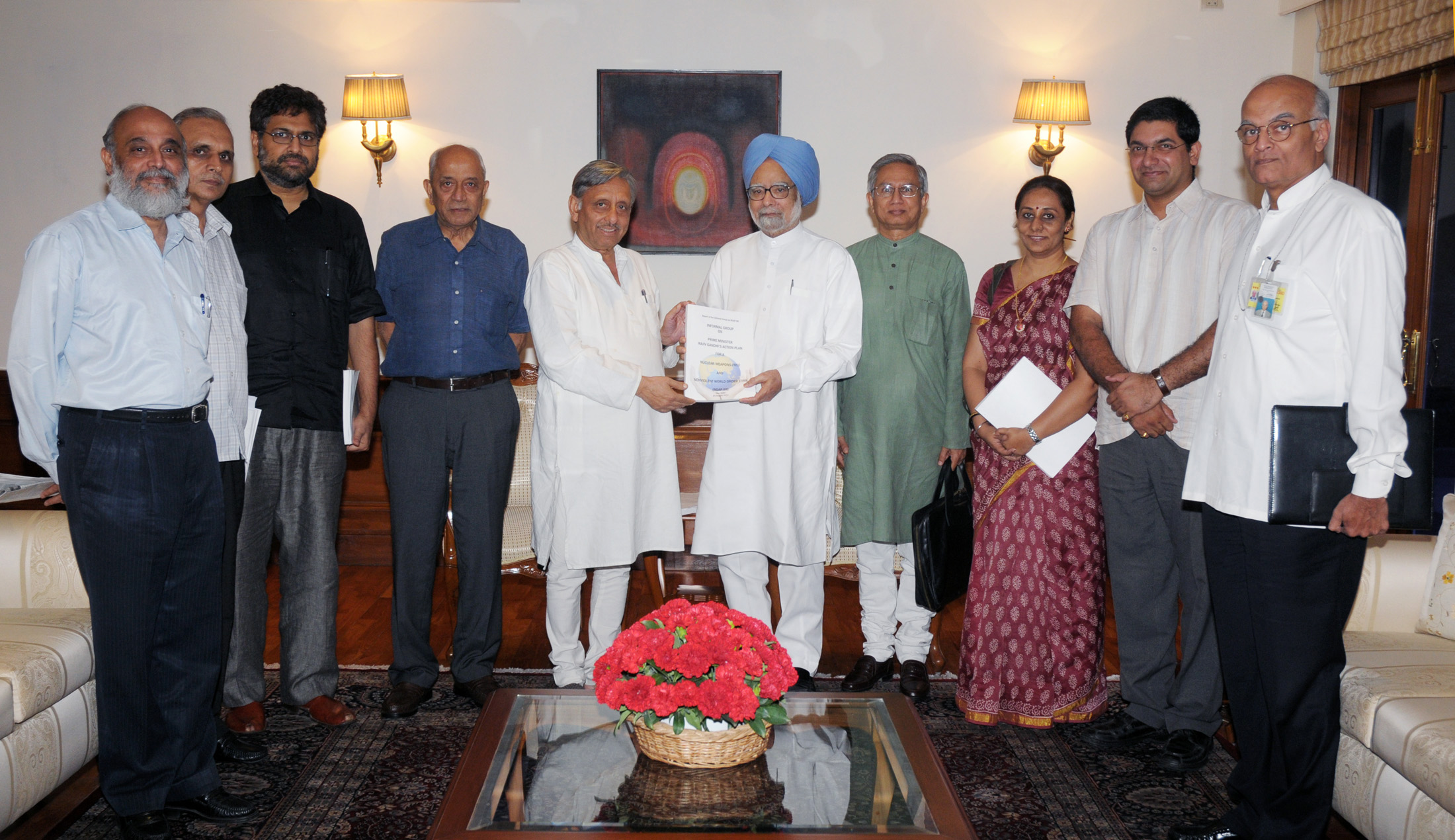
Varadarajan (third from left), as part of Informal Group on Nuclear-Weapons-Free and Nonviolent World, with Indian Prime Minister Manmohan Singh, in New Delhi, 2011.

Siddharth Varadarajan is a member of the International Founding Committee of The Real News, and was, until 2015, a board member of the inter-governmental B.P. Koirala India-Nepal Foundation.

Until 2015, he was also a member of the Executive Council of the Maulana Abul Kalam Azad Institute of Asian Studies, and a member of the Indian Council of World Affairs. He continues as a member of the editorial board of India Quarterly: A Journal of International Affairs. and in 2019, joined the International Advisory Council of the Sydney-based Judith Neilson Institute of Journalism and Ideas.

Varadarajan is a member of the Asia-Pacific Leadership Network for Nuclear Non-Proliferation and Disarmament (APLN).

== Reception ==
=== Awards and Accolades ===
In November 2005, the United Nations Correspondents Association awarded Siddharth Varadarajan the Elizabeth Neuffer Memorial Prize Silver Medal for Print Journalism for a series of articles, Persian Puzzle on Iran and the International Atomic Energy Agency.

In March 2006, he was awarded the Bernardo O'Higgins Order by the President of Chile—that country's highest civilian honor for a foreign citizen—for his contributions to journalism and to the promotion of India's relations with Latin America and Chile.

In July 2010, he received the Ramnath Goenka award for Journalist of the Year (Print).

He received the 2017 Shorenstein Journalism Award for outstanding reporting and for significant contributions to promoting freedom of the press in the Asia-Pacific region.

In May 2020, he is among 17 journalists from across the world recipients for the Germany based prestigious Deutsche Welle Freedom of Speech Award. The Freedom of Speech Award 2020 is for all courageous journalists worldwide who are suffering repressions because of their reporting on the pandemic.

Varadarajan received a Red Ink Award in December 2022 in the politics category for articles on Pegasus spyware.

Nai Duniya Foundation bestowed Varadarajan with "Media for Unity Award" in 2025.

In September 2026, Spanish newspaper El Mundo announced Varadarajan as recipient of its journalism award in the press freedom category.

== Legal cases ==
=== Ayodhya Cases ===
On 31 March 2020, The Wire had published a news report on a Ram Navami fair being conducted amidst the coronavirus pandemic in Uttar Pradesh. The report had misattributed a quote to the Chief Minister Yogi Adityanath and the paragraph containing it was tweeted by Varadarajan. On the following day, the report was corrected and Varadarajan himself issued a clarification, attributing the quote to the Hindutva stalwart Acharya Paramhans.

The Uttar Pradesh police registered two cases against Siddharth Varadarajan with FIR No 246/2020 and FIR No 269/2020, both registered at Police Station Ayodhya Kotwali, Ayodhya, calling the articles "objectionable ", on a number of charges including promoting enmity, cheating by impersonation and creating false alarm leading to panic.

The cases were filed after the correction and was followed by a tweet from Adityanath's media advisor who claimed that the action was taken because he had apparently not apologised or deleted the tweet, along with a warning that "[I]f you too are thinking of spreading lies about the Yogi government, please remove such thoughts from your mind."

Siddharth Varadarajan issued a statement to the police asking for a copy of the First Information Report (FIR) and the details of the specific actions that had been grounds for the registration of the cases, the statement was endorsed by the chairman of The Hindu Group, the editorial director of NDTV, the editor of Frontline magazine, the former editor of Jansatta daily, the consulting editor of the India Today Group and various other senior journalists. The founding editors of The Wire described the cases as a politically motivated attack on freedom of the press in India, and a condemnation against the cases was issued by a group of over 200 journalists from various media outlets who described it as "brazen attempt to muzzle the media".

The Police has filed Charge sheets in these cases and the two cases are pending before the Trial Courts in Ayodhya.

=== Rampur Case ===
In January 2021, The Wire published a report which was tweeted by Siddharth Varadarajan and quoted the grandfather of the farmer who had died during the farmers' protest in Delhi. In the report, the grandfather had claimed that his grandson had been shot by the police and that one of the doctors who had performed the autopsy had told him that the injuries he had sustained were caused by a bullet but was prevented from reporting it, in contradiction to the official post mortem report. The police at Rampur, Uttar Pradesh registered an FIR against Varadarajan on charges of public mischief and imputations against national integrity for publishing and tweeting the report.

Siddharth Varadarajan described it as malicious prosecution, stating that it has become a crime in the state of Uttar Pradesh to report statements of relatives of the deceased if they questioned the official narration of events. FIRs on similar grounds were also lodged against six other journalists including Vinod Jose of The Caravan which had reported on eyewitness claims that the police had shot the farmer and against the member of parliament Shashi Tharoor. The FIRs received condemnation from various media associations across the country who described it as a symptom of executive overreach.

In May 2022, the Allahabad High Court quashed this FIR registered in Rampur. While the Rampur police had alleged that the posts by Varadarajan sought to provocate the masses and spread riot, the High Court said that it did not find any opinion or assertion on the part of the accused persons having effect of provocation or incitement of violence.

=== Barabanki Case ===
An FIR was lodged in June 2021 against news portal The Wire and Varadrajan in Barabanki, Uttar Pradesh for a documentary titled ‘How a Mosque in UP’s Barabanki was Demolished’, alleging the documentary of spreading false information about religious scriptures of Muslims being thrown into a river after the demolition of a mosque by Barabanki administration.

Barabanki administration had demolished a mosque on 17 May 2026 alleging it as being an illegal construction, while the disputed video was posted on social media X through The Wire's account.

In August 2021, Varadrajan and other accused persons approached the Supreme Court to quash this FIR, calling it a blatant misuse of criminal law for crushing the right to freedom of expression. The Supreme Court granted them two months of interim protection from arrest, while directing the petitioners to approach the Allahabad High Court.

In March 2026, The Allahabad High Court stayed proceedings in this case saying that the FIR does not seem to attract prosecution for promoting enmity, while it also lacked prosecution sanction.

=== 2022 Meta/Malviya controversy ===
The Wire published and then withdrew a story concerning BJP IT-cell chief Amit Malviya and Meta/Facebook. Malviya filed a criminal complaint alleging offences including cheating, forgery and defamation. Delhi Police searched The Wire offices and editors' homes and seized electronic devices, including those belonging to Varadarajan.

=== OCI Card Dispute and alleged suppression of material facts ===
In early May, the Government of India rejected Varadrajan's request for conversion of his PIO card to OCI card. Varadrajan challenged this rejection before the Delhi High Court. On 12 May 2026, the Delhi High Court set aside this order calling it unreasoned. It restored Varadarajan's application for OCI card and directed the Central Government to pass a fresh order with reasons.

The Central Government informed Delhi High Court that the Allahabad High Court in 2020 had expressly put conditions on Varadrajan about not leaving India during pendency of trial without permission from the trial Court and also to surrender his passport to the given Court, but Varadrajan had failed to bring this fact on record before the Delhi High Court, which was a case of supression of fact.

The Delhi High Court found Varadarajan prima facie guilty of “suppressing material facts” and sought explanation from him through Affidavit. Varadarajan has tendered an unconditional apology before the High Court and has claimed to have forgotten it in bona-fide manner. The High Court has now sought reply from Central Government. The court noted that the trial had not commenced and directed him to appear before the trial court on 12 October 2026 and surrender his passport.

== Personal life ==
Siddharth Varadarajan is married to Nandini Sundar, a sociologist and anthropologist and Professor of Sociology at the Delhi School of Economics. His interests include Hindustan Ambassador cars, old maps and cigars. He is a citizen of the United States of America and carries an Overseas Citizenship of India. He is an atheist.

== Works ==
=== Books ===
- Gujarat The Making of a Tragedy. Penguin. 2003. ISBN 978-0143029014.
- Nonalignment 2.0: A Foreign and Strategic Policy for India in the 21st Century. Penguin. 2014. ISBN 978-0670086986.

=== Articles ===
- "Global threats and India's quest for strategic space" in Great Powers and Strategic Stability in the 21st Century (Ed: Graeme Herd) ISBN 978-0-415-56054-2

| Preceded by Harish Khare | Chief of the National Bureau; The Hindu; 2009- 2011 | Succeeded by Praveen Swami |

| Preceded by Narasimhan Ram | Editor; The Hindu; 2011-2013 | Succeeded by N. Ravi |
