= Dangerous Earth =

2020 non-fiction book by Ellen J. Prager

Dangerous Earth: What We Wish We Knew About Volcanoes, Hurricanes, Climate Change, Earthquakes, and More
- Author: Ellen J. Prager
- Language: English
- Subject: Earth Science; Environment
- Genre: Nonfiction
- Published: 2020
- Publisher: University of Chicago Press and Harper Collins
- Publication place: United States
- Media type: Hardcover
- Pages: 272
- ISBN: 978-9-3548-91014

Dangerous Earth: What We Wish We Knew About Volcanoes, Hurricanes, Climate Change, Earthquakes, and More is a non-fiction book by Ellen J. Prager, a marine biologist.

== Overview ==
Prager's book delves into the scientific exploration of a range of natural hazards, such as volcanoes, earthquakes, tsunamis, hurricanes, landslides, rip currents, and the perilous issue of climate change. Each chapter centers around a particular hazard, commencing with a significant historical event that transformed scientific knowledge and highlighting the enigmatic aspects that continue to surround these dynamic phenomena. The book also features perspectives from dedicated scientists who diligently interpret Earth's indications, convey its messages to humanity, and work towards preventing disastrous outcomes.

== Reception ==
Lars Backstrom writing for the Geological Society of London, "The book has an extensive list of resources, but lacks an index. Considering the width of the topics covered in this very short volume some things just had to be left out. I will not go into what, because that would give an unfair impression of an otherwise very comprehensive book that manages to go into surprising depth on the topics included."

In a book review article for The Hindu Business Line, Sudhirendar Sharma writes; "[the book] makes absorbing reading on the unexpected, and acts as an alert on knowing how to protect lives, property, and economic stability. Much has been written in recent times on climatic events, but it is the well-reasoned and engaging explanation offered by Prager that makes it a riveting read. Given the recent spurt in extreme weather events, scientists now consider this a whole new field of science which may be with or without the influence of climate change."

Writing for Geography Realm, G.T. Dempsey writes, "I thought of terming this book a primer on natural disasters and, if that is taken to mean a thorough introduction for the ordinary reader on what goes on on our planet and why, then it is very much that. But ‘primer’ can sound dismissive. So let's be clear. This short book is both a model of how to explain what our scientists have discovered about natural disasters and particularly climate change and how they have done so and an unequivocal caution for all of us to believe in their science."
