= G. Narasimhan =

Indian journalist (1916–1977)

Gopalan Narasimhan
- Born: 28 February 1916; Madras, British India
- Died: 5 July 1977 (aged 61); Madras, India
- Occupation: journalist
- Children: N. Ram, N. Ravi, N. Murali

Gopalan Narasimhan (28 February 1916 – 5 July 1977) was an Indian journalist and entrepreneur who served as the Managing Director of The Hindu from 1959 until his death in 1977. He was a grandson of S. Kasturi Ranga Iyengar, the patriarch of the family that owns The Hindu.

== Early life ==
Narasimhan was born in Madras on 28 February 1916 to K. Gopalan and Rangayanaki. Gopalan was the son of S. Kasturi Ranga Iyengar and younger brother of K. Srinivasan. Narasimhan's younger brother is G. Kasturi who served as Editor of The Hindu from 1965 to 1991.

Narasimhan graduated from the Presidency College, Madras and joined The Hindu at an early age. He was the Manager of The Hindu from 1937 to 1959. On the death of his uncle K. Srinivasan in 1959, Narasimhan became the Managing-Director.

== Career ==
Narasimhan served as Managing Director of The Hindu from 1959 to 1977. He also served as the President of the Indian and Eastern Newspapers Society (INS) during 1956-57, Chairman of the Audit Bureau of Circulations of India from 1955 to 1959, Press Institute of India and was the Director of the Press Foundation of Asia.

His eldest son N. Ram was the Managing-Director of The Hindu since 1977 and its Editor-in-Chief since 27 June 2003 until 18 January 2012, while his youngest son N. Ravi (b. 1948) served as the Editor-in-chief of The Hindu (1991–2003).

== Death ==
Narasimhan died of a heart attack at Madras on 5 July 1977, aged 61.
