= Suraag (1982 film) =

- Directed by: Jag Mundhra; Ambrish Sangal
- Written by: Subhash Kelkar; Ujjwal Kumar
- Starring: Sanjeev Kumar; Shabana Azmi; Parikshit Sahni
- Cinematography: Gérard Alcan
- Music by: Bappi Lahiri
- Release date: 26 March 1982
- Country: India
- Language: Hindi

Suraag is a 1982 Hindi-language crime film, directed and produced by Jag Mundhra, starring Sanjeev Kumar, Shabana Azmi, Parikshit Sahni in the lead roles.

== Plot ==
Professor Saxena and Dr. Gupta are friends living in Los Angeles (USA). Saxena is married to Geeta. Gupta wishes to marry an Indian woman with traditional values. On the advice of club owner Paul Khanna, Gupta places a matrimonial advertisement in an Indian newspaper and arrives in Bombay with Saxena to meet the prospective brides. After meeting some of the women that have answered his advertisement they decide that Sunita would make an ideal life for Gupta.

Gupta and Sunita get married. Gupta leaves for the US. After a few weeks, he sends Sunita a flight ticket to Los Angeles via New York. During the flight, a stranger plants cocaine in Sunita's vanity case but Sunita clears customs without the drugs being detected. Sunita calls her husband from New York before boarding her flight to Los Angeles. While Gupta, Saxena and Geeta wait at the Los Angeles airport, Sunita does not arrive as expected. Instead, they receive a message that Sunita has been kidnapped with a demand for ransom of $200,000.

Gupta pays the ransom but the kidnappers do not release his wife. Meanwhile, while watching a movie, Geeta spots an extra in a song sequence who resembles Sunita closely. This leads to the discovery that Sunita is really Bela, an aspiring actress, who had posed as a traditional Indian bride to be.

Saxena is determined to track down Sunita (Bela) and her co-conspirators. Suspicion falls on businessman Surinder Suri (Mac Mohan) in desperate need of cash because of gambling debts. Suri admits to using Sunita as a patsy to smuggle cocaine into the country to help him recoup his losses. However, he claims to know nothing about her kidnapping. He states that the cocaine has disappeared with her and caused him severe problems with his debts. Where then is Sunita (Bela)? Has she disappeared of her own accord or was she really kidnapped?

== Cast ==
- Sanjeev Kumar as Professor Saxena
- Shabana Azmi as Sunita / Bela
- Parikshit Sahni as Dr. Ajay Gupta
- Gita Siddharth as Geeta
- Mac Mohan as Surinder Suri
- Siddharth Kak as Paul Khanna
- Kavi Raz as Raju
- Rajesh Khanna as Qawwali Singer
- Tina Munim as Qawwali Singer
- Hema Malini as Herself
- Jayshree T. as Herself
- Asha Sachdev as Renu Lamba
- Mehmood as Professor Mahesh
- Shubha Khote as Sheela

== Soundtrack ==
The songs were composed by Bappi Lahiri and penned by Kaifi Azmi.

Song	Singer
"Bheega Bheega Mausam"	Lata Mangeshkar
"Kya Hua, Are Kya Hua"	Kishore Kumar
"Pyar Pyar Pyar Pyar"	Kishore Kumar
"Dhoondte Dhoondte"	Bappi Lahiri
"Mera Dil Liye Ja"	Asha Bhosle
"Woh Nazar Leke Rahi Dil, Tanana Haiya Hu"	Asha Bhosle, Mohammed Rafi
