= N. Ravi =

Indian journalist

Narasimhan Ravi
- Born: 2 January 1948 (age 78); Madras, India
- Occupation: Journalist
- Known for: Journalism
- Title: Director of Kasturi & Sons Ltd, Editor-in-Chief of The Hindu

Narasimhan Ravi is an Indian journalist and the current director of Kasturi & Sons Ltd. He served as the editor-in-chief of The Hindu from 1991 to 2003 and then again took over the position in October 2013.

== Early life and education ==
Ravi was born in Madras in 1948. He is the youngest son of journalist G. Narasimhan. Ravi's elder brothers are N. Ram (Chairman of Kasturi & Sons Limited, the company that owns and publishes The Hindu), and N. Murali (Co-Chairman of KSL). Ravi had his early education in Madras and joined The Hindu in 1972.

== Career ==
Ravi served as the Washington correspondent of The Hindu from 1977 to 1980 and became deputy editor in 1980 and later, associate editor. In 1991, he succeeded his uncle, G. Kasturi as editor on the former's retirement. Ravi served as editor till July 2003 when N. Ram, the managing director, took over. Subsequent to changes in Editorial and Business roles of The Hindu in October 2013, N. Ravi has taken over as editor-in-chief of The Hindu.
