= 2014: The Election that Changed India =

Book by Rajdeep Sardesai

- Author: Rajdeep Sardesai
- Language: English
- Subject: Politics of India, 2014 Indian general election
- Publisher: Penguin Books India
- Publication date: 26 May 2015
- Publication place: India
- Pages: 372
- ISBN: 9780143424987
- OCLC: 921981462

2014: The Election that Changed India is a 2015 book by Rajdeep Sardesai, a writer and journalist.

In his book, Sardesai tells the story of the 2014 Indian general election. It was released on 1 November 2014. The book follows through the major stories of the 2014 Loksabha elections which affected the fate of Narendra Modi, Manmohan Singh and Rahul Gandhi.

It was the first time since 1984 that a party had won enough seats to govern without the support of other parties.

As per the requirements of the Indian Constitution, elections to the Lok Sabha must be held at an interval of five years or whenever parliament is dissolved by the president. The previous election, to the 15th Lok Sabha, was conducted in April–May 2009, and its term would have naturally expired on 31 May 2014.

== Reception ==
In the Deccan Chronicle Suparna Sharma wrote that "Rajdeep Sardesai gives us almost a fly-on-the-wall account of the campaign of one party" and "With broad, confident brushstrokes he creates, in true kshatriya tradition, character sketches, post-script of course, of Modi the winner and Rahul the loser. He analyses and judges personalities by what they did on the battlefield, no so much by who they are, or what they stand for".
