= Hindu Tamil Thisai =

Tamil daily newspaper headquartered at Chennai

- Type: Daily newspaper
- Format: Broadsheet
- Owner: The Hindu Group
- Founded: 16 September 2013; 12 years ago
- Language: Tamil
- Headquarters: Chennai, Tamil Nadu, India
- Website: www.hindutamil.in

Hindu Tamil Thisai (colloquially known as The Hindu Tamil) is a Tamil daily newspaper headquartered at Chennai. It is published by The Hindu Group. The first issue was published on 16 September 2013. It is printed in seven centres including Chennai. The printing centres are at Chennai, Coimbatore, Madurai, Tiruchirappalli, Thiruvananthapuram, Bengaluru and Tirupathi. The Tamil newspaper covers news related to business, education, knowledge, sports, quiz, environment, literature and entertainment. The daily has extensive regional, national and international news coverage.
