= Tunku Varadarajan =

Indian-British journalist

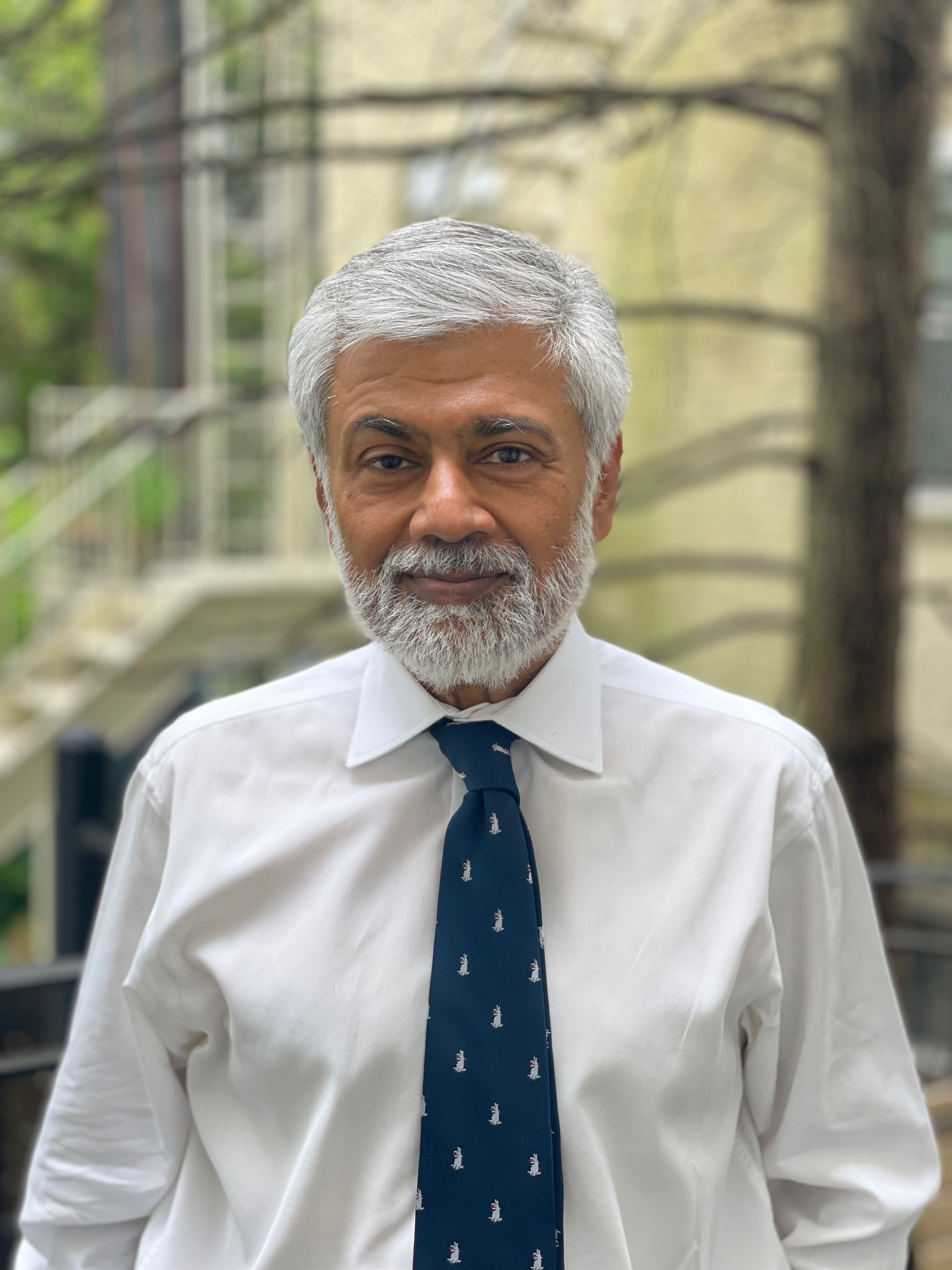
- Varadarajan in May 2024
- Born: Patanjali Varadarajan; 28 August 1962 (age 64); Delhi, India
- Citizenship: Indian (former); British (naturalised)
- Education: Trinity College, Oxford
- Occupations: Writer, journalist, teacher
- Known for: Essays, interviews, classical liberalism views
- Spouse: Amy Finnerty
- Children: 3
- Parents: Muthusamy Varadarajan (father); Usha (mother)
- Relatives: Siddharth Varadarajan (brother)

Tunku Varadarajan /ˈtʊŋkuː ˌvɑːrədəˈrɑːdʒən/ (born Patanjali Varadarajan in 1962) is an Indian-born naturalised British writer and journalist, formerly editor of Newsweek Global and Newsweek International. He is a fellow at the American Enterprise Institute, to which he has been affiliated since February 2021. He is also a fellow at the Classical Liberal Institute at New York University Law School, and at the Center on Capitalism and Society at Columbia University. He is a contributor under contract to The Wall Street Journal, where he writes weekend interviews and book reviews for the editorial page. He was earlier the Virginia Hobbs Carpenter Research Fellow in Journalism at the Hoover Institution at Stanford University, and a contributing editor at Politico Europe.

== Early life and education ==
Varadarajan was born in Delhi, India to a Tamil Brahmin family with roots in Chidambaram, Tamil Nadu, India. His father, Muthusamy Varadarajan, was an IAS officer. His mother, Usha, was a businesswoman. His earliest years were spent in New York, where he attended The Town School. He later attended Mayo College in Ajmer, Rajasthan, India with his brother Siddharth Varadarajan, as well as Dulwich College, London. After high school, he attended Trinity College, Oxford University from which he graduated with a Bachelor of Arts degree in law in 1984.

== Career ==
After six years as a lecturer in law, Tunku Varadarajan left Oxford in 1993 to join The Times as a leader (editorial) writer under the editor, Peter Stothard. He specialized in international affairs, law, society, and culture. In 1996, he moved to Spain as the newspaper's Madrid bureau chief. In 1997, he was named the newspaper's New York City bureau chief.

In 2000, Varadarajan joined the editorial page of The Wall Street Journal, under its editor, Robert L. Bartley. He worked there as a senior editorial writer, deputy editorial features editor, chief television and media critics, and, for five years, as the paper's editorial features ("op-ed") editor (a post to which he was appointed by the paper's editorial page editor, Paul A. Gigot.) He also wrote a column, "Citizen of the World," for which he received an award from South Asian Journalists Association in 2002. The citation read, "for a year's worth of his consistently engaging and controversial opinion pieces about South Asia (and other global topics) in the newspaper and on its sister site, OpinionJournal.com."

In 2009, Varadarajan left Forbes for The Daily Beast, where he was appointed writer-at-large, tasked with writing opinion columns on politics, foreign affairs, and American culture. When Newsweek merged with The Daily Beast in December 2010, Varadarajan was named editor of Newsweek International by editor-in-chief Tina Brown. In December 2012, he became the first editor of Newsweek Global, the all-digital publication that took the place of the magazine's print edition. He resigned from that job in late April 2013.

Varadarajan was associated with the Hoover Institution at Stanford University for several years, including as the Virginia Hobbs Carpenter Research Fellow in Journalism, and was the editor of Defining Ideas, a Hoover Institution publication. He is now a fellow at the AEI,

== Controversies ==
In November 2009, subsequent to the Fort Hood shooting, Forbes.com published an article by Varadarajan titled "Going Muslim", a play on the colloquial American phrase "Going Postal". The opinion essay prompted some controversy, including political objections from some students at New York University, where he was a clinical professor, as well as in the media. NYU President John Sexton condemned the remarks as offensive. In the article "Is Your Professor an Islamophobe?", Columbia University epidemiologist and HuffPost contributor, Abdul El-Sayed, quoted Varadarajan's article, among others, when he discussed phenomenon of "a growing number of academics using (their) intellectual identity to promote intolerance and xenophobia against Islam and Muslims".

== Personal life ==
A British citizen, Varadarajan lives in Brooklyn, New York, United States with his wife Amy Finnerty and their three children. He is a member of the Century Association in New York, and is on the Media Advisory Committee of AmeriCares.
