= Gujarat: The Making of a Tragedy =

2002 book

- Editor: Siddharth Varadarajan
- Genre: Non-fiction
- Publisher: Penguin
- Publication date: 2002
- ISBN: 978-0143029014

Gujarat: The Making of a Tragedy is a book about the 2002 Gujarat riots edited by Siddharth Varadarajan.

== Contents ==
The book has the following sections: "Introduction", "The Violence", "The Aftermath", and "Essays and Analysis" together with two appendices. Besides two chapters penned by Varadarajan (one as co-author), titled 'The Truth Hurts—Gujarat and the Role of the Media', and 'I salute you Geetaben', the book collects contributions from several journalists, activists, and scholars including Ramachandra Guha, Rajdeep Sardesai, Barkha Dutt, Teesta Setalvad, A.G. Noorani, Vrinda Grover, Shail Mayaram, Mahasweta Devi, Vibhuti Narain Rai, G.N. Devy, Jyoti Punwani, Nandini Sundar, Mohandas Namishray, and others.

== Reviews ==
=== India Today ===
In a review of the book published in India Today magazine, Karan Thapar writes:

Siddharth Varadarajan's book is the clever man's guide through the maze of facts, theories and arguments that surround what happened in Gujarat in February and March 2002. He and his fellow writers do not answer all your questions but they take you closer to answering them for yourselves. However, their efforts serve another purpose as well. They provide a chronicle and an independent archive of facts. Should you forget or become confused, should your memory falter or be questioned, this book puts together all that we know, all that we have surmised and all that we have assumed about the carnage in Gujarat.

Thapar has claimed that just as there is no direct evidence for Hitler's personal complicity in the Holocaust, and his complicity has to be inferred, so also Narendra Modi's complicity in the 2002 Gujarat riots will have to be inferred after constructing and reconstructing the available evidence.

=== Times of India ===
In an op-ed in the Times of India, Vrinda Nabar writes that reading this book is a 'numbing' experience. Nabar writes that reading this book makes it obvious that the effort required from the State of Gujarat towards rehabilitation of victims and relief work was found wanting and that ghettoization increased significantly since the riots. Nabar states that this incident was a turning point for pluralism in India.

=== The Hindu ===
In an op-ed in The Hindu, Sohail Hashmi writes that the contents of this book point to a collusion between the police and the administration with respect to either direct or indirect complicity in the riots. Hashmi compares the book to a knife piercing through middle class decency to expose prejudice and fanaticism. Hashmi writes that just as Nazis would place the Star of David before every Jewish house to avoid "mistakes", so the RSS, VHP, Bajrang Dal and their affiliated groups would place posters of Hanuman outside a Hindu house during the 2002 Gujarat violence. Hashmi quotes M. S. Golwalkar's endorsement of 1939 Germany and writes "The Khaki shorts have learnt their lesson well. This book is not for them: it may help others to prevent another Gujarat."

=== The Telegraph ===
In an op-ed in The Telegraph, Sreyashi Dastidar writes that this book presents a chronology of the attacks on minorities that had been taking place since the 90s which finally culminated in the 'state-sponsored pogrom'. She writes that numerous investigating teams indicted the Bharatiya Janata Party ruling the state and the center, and the media—excepting the Gujarati media—supported the indictment. But the December 2002 electoral victory of Narendra Modi in the Gujarat elections nullified the arraignment. Dastidar goes on to write that although the book wants to make a distinction between "Hindus" and those who participated in the violence, in her opinion most Hindus in Gujarat became complicit in the violence by voting Modi back to power, and that only those Hindus who did not vote for Modi can escape this culpability.

Dastidar is critical of the Congress party for not strongly raising the issue of the death of 76-year-old Ehsan Jafri, a former Congress MP, who had been sheltering more than 60 people in his house when he was butchered during the riots. Dastidar also criticizes the Muslim ministers in the BJP who became complicit in the violence through their silence; none of them resigned. Shahnawaz Hussain wanted to be sent to Gujarat for relief work, but did not protest when his demand was rejected.

Dastidar goes on to admire the 'clockwork precision' with which the whole operation was executed—from the burning of the train to the swearing-in ceremony at Modi's second term as Chief Minister. The same 'precision', writes Dastidar, was responsible for the multiple 'sporadic' incidents of violence ten months after Godhra. Dastidar writes that the burning of the S-6 coach was pre-planned as per independent probes and forensic reports, and the theory of a 'spontaneous' attack on one compartment of the train is 'absurd' considering that no one jumped out of it to save themselves. Dastidar goes on to write that what emerges from reading this book is:

a set of paradoxes. For instance, Muslims are accused of not joining the mainstream. But wherever they have tried to do so in Gujarat, they have been beaten back into their ghettos. Again, the Sangh Parivar’s fears that Muslims may outnumber Hindus one day (because of the high birth-rate myth) played a vital role in the killings. But in raping Muslim women, the Hindu mob risked adding to these threatening numbers.

Dastidar also writes that, according to a senior IPS officer, no riot can go on for more than 24 hours unless the state is complicit in it. In Gujarat, writes Dastidar, the state became a cheerleader for the riots while the opposition was not heard because its protest was muted. Although the complicity of the state in the violence is often pointed out, writes Dastidar, the role played by the opposition is not analyzed sufficiently.

== Books ==
Varadarajan, Siddharth (ed)(2002). Gujarat: The Making of a Tragedy. Penguin. ISBN 978-0143029014
