= Muthusamy Varadarajan =

Indian civil servant (1933–2014)

- Other name: Varad
- Education: Madras University
- Occupation: Civil servant
- Organization: Indian Administrative Service
- Relatives: Tunku Varadarajan (son), Siddharth Varadarajan (son), Nandini Sundar (daughter-in-law)
- Honours: Legion of Honour

Muthusamy Varadarajan (1933–2014) was an Indian civil servant. He was a minister at the Indian High Commission in London from 1979 to 1983, and later served as the permanent secretary in the Ministry of Culture in New Delhi.

== Career ==
Varadarajan joined the Uttar Pradesh cadre of the Indian Administrative Service in 1956. He initiated several district-level community-based schemes to help the poor and the lower castes. He believed in secularism and gained the respect of both Hindus and Muslims.

Apart from his later appointments as a minister at the Indian High Commission in London and as the permanent secretary in the Ministry of Culture in New Delhi, he also served as executive director of the Indian Council for Child Welfare, member of the National Commission for Minorities, chairman of the National Museum of India, and president of Alliance Française in Delhi.

Varadarajan wrote books including "Handcrafted Indian Enamel Jewellery" and "Incredible India: Traditions & Rituals."

Varadarajan was made a Chevalier of the Légion d’honneur of the French Republic in 2010.
