= Mano Ya Na Mano (2006 TV series) =

2006 Indian reality television program

- Written by: Ratneshwar K Singh, Yogesh Raut, Smita Nair Jain (Season 1); Nitin Keswani (Season 2)
- Directed by: Antara Kak, Yogesh Raut, Ravi Davala (Season 1); Rajesh Ranshinge (Season 2)
- Presented by: Irrfan Khan (Season 1); Mishal Raheja (Season 2)
- Country of origin: India
- Original language: Hindi
- No. of seasons: 2
- No. of episodes: 102

Production
- Producer: Siddharth Kak
- Cinematography: Anil C J, Gajendra Dangwal, Chandan Goswami, Neha Parti(Season 1)
- Production company: Cinema Vision India

Original release
- Network: STAR One
- Release: 2006

Mano Ya Na Mano (transl. Believe It Or Not) is an Indian TV show inspired by true incidents that took place in various places. It was produced by Siddharth Kak and aired on STAR One in India. The 1st season was hosted by Irrfan Khan in 2006, while Mishal Raheja hosted Season 2 in 2010.

== Episodes ==
=== Season 1 ===
No. overall	No. in season	Title
1	1	"Future prediction and Incarnation of Lord Hanuman"
The first story is about Amba, a 14-year-old girl, who writes a poem to her father, wherein she predicts her death at the age of 21, which comes to pass. The second story is of a washerman, a great believer of lord 'Hanuman', whose prayers for sons like Pawan Putra come true and he is blessed with three ugly sons. These three brothers are taken care of by their elder brother Murugeshan and his wife Murugeshwari.
2	2	"The Story of Captain Saini and Sudama"
The first story is about Captain K. K. Saini when he was dejected with his life and conduct, his father followed the path of Bhrigu Samhita, with the help of which Saini learns his past, present, and future. In the second story, Sudhama goes missing in the forest. 12 years later, he is found as a feral boy. With the help of his family, Sudhama is trying to live like a normal human being.
3	3	"Mystery of Bhangarh and jackals who feed on holy offering"
Irfan Khan talks about Bhangarh and Ajabgarh, which are abandoned and not safe to stay in after dusk. It is believed that Bhangarh was cursed by a dying magician. Irfan mentions a temple in the desert of Kutch where jackals first eat the holy offering. The villagers follow their devotion before any good deed.
4	4	"Anthony bungalow in Gujarat forest"
Irfan talks about a palace located in the jungles of Gujarat. During British rule, an officer tried to molest a dancer, who later committed suicide. People believe that the dancer's soul haunts the palace. In the second part, the narrator describes the Thaipusam festival in which the devotees follow a ritual of inserting a skewer through their tongue and cheeks to have their wishes fulfilled.
5	5	"Tarot Card Reading and Baba Kamar Ali Darwesh"
Irfan talks about tarot cards. Dr. Roopa Patel discusses the accuracy of tarot card reading. A judge believes in tarot card prediction and experienced its accuracy at the time of his operation. A girl who lost her mother years ago finds answers with the help of tarot cards. Baba Kamar Ali Durvesh is known for rescuing villagers from a demon, which he captures in a stone.
6	6	"Temple of Chowdeshwari and the Explanation of Dreams"
Irfan talks about magical writing where people write through an unknown force. Chowdeshwari temple is located in a small village called Dasarighatta, where it is believed that various mysteries of life are solved. Chowdeshwari Devi answers her devotees' queries by writing on rice flour. In the second half, Irfan talks about dreams. Monica Drego, Mahrukh Kama, and Srishti Vaswani share their dreams. Francis Menezes speaks about dreams and their relation to one's life.
7	7	"Ajjya River in Karnataka"
Irfan describes Ajjayya River in Karnataka, where it is believed that possessing spirits release the host body. Later he narrates about Renuka and Chetan, who are possessed by spirits. The second half describes the story of Fosten, who finds an ancient Portuguese coin in a fish and starts researching about a ship wreck, resulting in the discovery of a ship that sank four hundred years ago.
8	8	"Dwarika palace is still immersed in the ocean"
Irfan talks about the Dwaraka. Dr. S.R. Rao, a marine archaeologist, points out that according to the Mahabharat epic, Dwaraka palace is under the ocean. According to marine archaeologists, the town under the ocean may be a port and not Dwaraka palace. In the second part, Irfan describes Pir Shah Wilayat Dargah in Moradabad, where non-poisonous scorpions dwell.
9	9	"Past life regression therapy"
Irfan describes past life regression therapy. Indira, who was tormented by her husband, meets Dr. Yuvraj Kapadia and is helped by past-life regression therapy. In a village called Jalna in Maharashtra Abdul Jabbar and Gousiya Begum's sons look like snakes.
10	10	"Crystal ball reading"
Meher finds her lost jewelry with the help of Lara Shah, a holistic healer. In the second part, there is a lantern continuously burning without oil for the last twenty-seven years, and a pond that responds to claps.
11	11	"Naadi Shastra"
Malati Subhramanyan explains about Naadi Shastra. Maria and Rahul are separated due to a few misunderstandings for which Maria seeks Naadi Shastra's help and is now happy in her life. In the second part, Bhuvan suffers from illusions of a place named Lonar and he decides to explore it.
12	12	"Karalmanna villagers were worried"
Tantya Mama was famous for his bravery and was also a magician who tricked British officers. In the second part, Irfan talks about a human's footprints larger than an elephant's footprints. S.R. Krishna Swamy and N.S. Rangraju investigate the big footprints. In Karalmanna the villagers find a "Shivling" in a cave.
13	13	"Jayanti Bhai and the mystery of St. Francis Xavier"
Irfan speaks about a person named Jayanti Bhai who experienced a miracle. After his death, he observed a miraculous light and was back to life and has the power to communicate with animals. In the second half, there is a 450-year-old, St. Francis Xavier's body that remains undeteriorated in a church in Goa.
14	14	"Lord Shani's temple in Shingadapur"
In Shingnapur, people have never experienced theft. In the second part, Irfan narrates an incident in Susner, Madhya Pradesh. A young boy named Kanhaiya remembers his past life and calls himself Sanjay.
15	15	"Ramayana and the mystery behind Abhaykumar Deora's life"
Irfan talks about the mystery relating to Abhaykumar Deora, who has survived without food for the past five years. Dr. Chandrudutt Havaldar says that Deora's organs are normal even after fasting for a long time.
16	16	"The mysterious bangle and the attachment with wild animals"
Suchitra finds a mysterious bangle in the Kaveri River which changed her life. On visiting Talkad she discovers that the places and people are similar to those in her dreams. Some priests mention that the bangle belongs to the queen of ancient times. Suchitra throws the bangle back into the river. In the second half, Dr. Prakash Amte of Maharashtra has a special attachment with wild animals, which never harm him.
17	17	"Power of Aura Therapy and mystery behind Champaner"
Geeta Thakkar explains aura therapy. The doctors treat Sapna with the help of Rudraksh, crystal, and Reiki. In the second half, the city Champaner located in Gujarat was once known as the land of gods, but it is now haunted. Sonal Mithal Modi mentions that the land of Champaner was cursed by Bhadra.
18	18	"Auto writing techniques"
Kashmira Elavia communicates with dead souls after her young daughter died. Jamsheed Vachha and Nan Umrigar share their experiences about auto writing. In the second part, Irfan narrates the history of the Himalayas and the research conducted. Zamaan Ali shares his experience about yeti.
19	19	"Dowsing Therapy and mystery of the queen of Georgia"
Mukesh loses his brother, whom he looked after following their parents' death. Mukesh travels from Allahabad to Mumbai to look for his brother Rakesh. Mukesh contacts a dowsing therapist to get help. Queen Ketevan was kept in prison by King Shah Abbas before being brutally killed.
20	20	"Touch and Vibration therapy"
One day during meditation, Mulkraj Das sees a yellow light and thinks he has lost his eye. He feels some kind of change in himself, and his touch has cured his friend's knee pain. After that, he came back to India to treat every pain through his touch therapy.
21	21	"Thug community and Future prediction"
During 1830 the A.D Fraud tribe killed people and stole their belongings. They used to meet on Dushera and on that day they used to initiate new members into the cult who may be as young as 15 or 16 years old. Colonel W.H Sleeman used to declare their death statement. Nawal Gani predicts through coffee cup reading.
22	22	"Bringing rain and Healing by painting"
Mellur village, near Madurai, Tamil Nadu, gets no rain because of the absence of clouds. People pray for rain. Balakrishnan absorbs heat from land to form clouds for rain. Yogini solves people's problems through painting.
23	23	"Clairvoyance"
In a Delhi hospital, a baby girl named Pawani is fighting for her life in February 2005 and was dependent on dialysis. Pawani's parents met Ashwini Ji, who advised them to remove the dialysis machine which could save her. Tapsya Singh with her sixth sense can communicate with the spirits and angels.
24	24	"Numerology"
Meenakshi is unsuccessful is pursuing film. Nisha advises her to meet numerologist Neeraj Mancchanda. There are rats worshiped with goddess in the Karni Mata Temple in Rajasthan. Chaitanya's parents reach Karni Mata's temple to find answers to Chaitanya's troubles.
25	25	"Human with a tail"
Irfan asks questions about the monkey man and introduces Chandre, who has a tail. In the second half, Irfan talks about a 500-year old coffin in which a person was buried alive as a punishment. The villagers were asked to hit the coffin five times when they pass by.
26	26	"Snake Mano from Chennai and mystic powers of gems"
Irfan introduces Maano, a snake charmer who catches poisonous snakes. In the second part, Irfan explores the secrets of birth stones and describes Khabir's experiences with birthstones.
27	27	"Predcting Future"
Irfan describes a place where after burning a dead body in front of the temple, temple authorities start with puja. In the other half, he describes a marble with some personal experiences of locals.
28	28	"Tarot cards"
Irfan describes Kishore and his past experiences with a goddess, who asks him to perform miracles, like taking out puris from boiling oil. In the second half, he introduces Sherin, who is madly in love but later becomes abnormal.
29	29	"Subconscious mind"
Dr. Sharma explains the positive and negative attributes of the subconscious mind. A person cures the disease of his subconscious mind.
30	30	"Kalaripayattu and Marma therapy"
Irfan gives information about Kalaripayattu's positive and negative effects on humans. In the olden days, kings used the technique to fight with their enemy. In other half, he gives information about a temple in the Himalayas in which a small fire has been burning for hundreds of years.
31	31	"Magnetotherapy"
Irfan explains the importance of magnets and its power. Maya takes magnetic therapy treatment for the increase in blood sugar levels. In the second half, Irfan talks about a tree filled with invisible souls in Kerala, which has been tied with big chains.
32	32	"Mass Hysteria and Face Reading"
Irfan talks about a soldier who died mysteriously, while the Indian army believes he is alive and is given some amenities. In the other half, he tells us about Mony Singh and the science of body features.
33	33	"Electric body and Hypnotism"
Irfan talks about Mohan, whose body is filled with electric current. In the second half, Acharya as a hypnotist who shares his experiences. Dr. Rajeev talks about the effects which come from hypnotism.
34	34	"Pyare Babu curing gall bladder stones using mystic power"
Irfan talks about an operation that did not require a scalpel. In the second half, Irfan describes Kutti Chethan and his mysteries around his disciples.
35	35	"Shri Briradhiya Baba"
Irfan talks about Selvaraj's precognitive abilities and helps police look for stolen vehicles. In the second half, Irfan talks about the importance of names.
36	36	"Satyanarayan Baba from Raigarh (Chhattisgarh)"
Irfan talks about saints, like Sathyanaran Baba, who has meditated many years in any kind of weather without consuming food. In the second half, Irfan talks about wandering souls around human beings. A student shares her experiences in calling a wandering soul. Swetha shares some experiences with some souls.
37	37	"Foot reading and Sun therapy"
Yatri Joshi talks about foot readings. Kamini Khanna, an astrologer does the same job of foot reading but based on foot shapes. Uma Shankar who has been miraculously surviving since 10 years on sunrays. He advises people to take sun therapy to cure diseases.
38	38	"Martial arts from Shaolin temple"
Irfan talks about a story based on meditation. Kanishka Sharma, a martial artist, believes in Chinese medicines, and follows Shaolin Temple to cure people. Kanishka teaches martial arts to Shahrukh Khan, Arjun Rampal and Priyanka Chopra during the making of the movie Don. The other story is about Prakash Desai, a pilot who develops a strange disease of frequent fainting. He consults Shruti, Beej Mantra specialist and Seshpal Restogi, music therapist, based on meditation and gets miraculously cured.
39	39	"Universal scanner from Dr. Maneam Murthi"
Pramod, who believed in Prem Shankar Sharma's medication, experiences its impact after an accident and his vision recovers. The other story is about a scientist, Maniam Murthy, and his "Universal Scanner". He solves the kidnapping case of Asmita and finds out the culprit with the help of his universal scanner.
40	40	"Crocodile in a temple"
Irfan talks about a crocodile who stays in a lake in a temple and is believed to have some spiritual power in it, as it is completely vegetarian and does not grow old by the day. The other story revolves around Sibhavana Gahkar, a holistic healer who cures people with cosmic energy.
41	41	"ESP and Meher Baba"
Irfan talks about Santosh who lives in Jharkhand and has extrasensory perception. The other story is about Meher Baba, who helps resolve people's issues via supernatural means.
42	42	"Santhara Fast"
Irfan talks about Dilip Chaurasia, who has suffered from insomnia for the past 20 years and is assumed to be cursed by an angel. The other story revolves around Lalchand Jain and his family.
43	43	"Dr. Orbito's psychic surgery and "Hasth Mudra""
Irfan talks about Alex Orbito in the Philippines. Siddharth Kak visits him and meets Eutiquio Catawtan, a patient who has been healed by the psychic surgeon. The other story revolves around Kamya, who suffers from insomnia and stress after Shiv's death. Kamya seeks help from spiritual healers Acharya Keshavdevji Maharaj and Acharya Vikramaditya, and miraculously recovers with the help of Dhyan Mudra.
44	44	"Mummies of Kabayan and Flower therapy"
Irfan talks about mummies in the Philippines. Siddharth Kak visits and learns the process of mummification from Florentino Merino. The other story talks about Flower Healing Therapy, where Bhoomika Chawla meets Dr. Shah, who tells her the story of Meenakshi and Rahul and their complications in conceiving.
45	45	"Dr. Newton Kondaveti and Prakash Tata"
Irfan talks about a story based on past life regression. Newton Kondaveti, a past life regression therapist, solves Rajan and his sister's case, where her son reincarnates as her brother and reminds everyone of his rebirth. The other story is about Prakash Tata, who cures Maya with his spiritual powers.
46	46	"Naagkanya"
Irfan tells a story about Javed, who marries a girl that is believed to be Icchadari Nagin. Dattaram Seth cures several people with his ailments. The other story discusses parapsychologist R.D. Pala, who cures Jyoti with her personal problems.
47	47	"Poorna Kumbha Mela"
Irfan talks about Hatyogis during Kumbh Mela in Allahabad. Premanand Bharti gives information on various saints performing different sadhanas to achieve supreme power. The other story is about Dr. Dara, who predicts the future and present of people using biorhythm software.
48	48	"Astrology"
Irfan talks about Kamini's astrology. The other story revolves around Manohar, whose spirit meets his friends on his deathday.
49	49	"Vaastu Shastra and Dada Hayat Kalandar"
The first part is about Inspector Vijay Patil, who is in charge of a police station in Pune. He investigates various robbery cases but fails to locate the evil powers behind the case. Later, a Vastu consultant, Mayank Barjatya helps him eliminate the evil powers through his Vastu instruments. The other part talks about the spirituality of Dargah Hazrat Dada Hayat Qalandar.
50	50	"Glass reader and living water"
The first part is about Satish Sinha, who deals in a crane business. A glass reader, Pandit Om Prakash, helps him solve his problems. He predicts the future and past incidents through glass water techniques. He also helps Vikas Chaturvedi to retrieve his diamond ring. The show also focuses on the miraculous powers of water and its importance in life.
51	51	"Snake bites and pyramid house"
The story focuses on a farmer who was victimized by snakes. It is believed the snakes attack him because of his body odour. A second story talks about Subhash Patri, founder of Pyramid Spiritual Society of India.
52	52	"Witch"
Irfan narrates an incident that occurred in the Tamil Nadu district. Viswanath gets on a bus to visit Kerben but has to walk for a long distance. In between, he faces obstacles on his way by devil spirits, and becomes tormented on seeing tragedies occurring in the village and his family. Through the spiritual procedures, he helps eliminate the devil spirit from the village.
53	53	"Future prediction by fire"
Irfan describes a fire incident. Brij practices prediction by fire techniques, and can predict Bhumika's future by experimenting on fire. He loses his consciousness while practicing and gets admitted to the hospital. Later, Shilpa enlightens Brij's parents that he has been influenced by Dr. Rohini to practice the same. Brij continues to experiment on fire in order to rescue Bhumika's life.
54	54	"Possessed"
Irfan talks about Shubro, who is horrified by Suneeta's abnormal behaviour. A psychiatrist explains to Shubro that she has been suffering from a psychological problem due to frustrations in her life, and advises him to take care of her. Shubro learns that Suneeta has been victimised by an evil spirit, and takes her to Ajjaiyya temple to cure her.
55	55	"Murder mystery"
Irfan describes an incident that occurred in a village of Madhya Pradesh. After Sanjay's death, his mother becomes assured of his reincarnation. Sanjay is reborn as Kanhaiya and reminisces about his murder in his previous birth. Kanhaiya's parents try to treat him under an exorcist.
56	56	"Fortune teller"
Irfan talks about Mihir's incident. Arnav and Mihir are close friends. An astrologer interacts with Arnav and predicts his bright future, but foresees Mihir's water accident after feeling the energy in his pen. Arnav and Mihir's girlfriend seek the astrologer's help to rescue Mihir.
57	57	"Bhangarh Fort"
Irfan narrates an incident that occurred in Bhangarh, Rajasthan. Mahesh and Monika do a live telecast, but they become victims of devil spirits. To promote the media, and rescue Mahesh and Bhumika, Aditya visits Bhangarh. Finally, he himself becomes a victim.
58	58	"Death dream"
Irfan talks about the omens of death. As an actor, Ravi is concerned about his face. Later, he becomes tormented by bad dreams regarding his death. Instead of getting sympathy from friends, he gets predictions about his future tragedy. Finally, he dies after facing a bad incident.
59	59	"Killer tree"
Irfan narrates an incident of a killer tree in Chaandpur, Orissa. Shivu's father becomes victimized by the devil spirit. Shivu sees a village girl, Jhilli who becomes a victim of the same spirit. Shivu attempts to banish the devil but gets killed by the evil spirit.
60	60	"Coffee grounds reader"
Irfan talks about the coffee grounds reader. During a party in Bangalore, Ria is introduced and is informed that she will predict the future by looking into coffee mugs. Ria informs Shetty that he will live a long life but die in a car accident the very night. Ria asks the police commissioner for a DNA test to identify the dead body which is determined to not be Shetty. Mr. Shetty narrates his story when Ria takes the police to his hideout.
61	61	"Nazarwadi's curse"
Irfan talks about Nazarwadi and the story of Neha and Amol. Amol's car breaks down while he is taking Neha to the hospital for childbirth. A woman offers to help Amol, and asks him to get some medicine. Amol comes back and sees that the woman's house is locked. Amol learns that the woman who offered to help him, died many years ago. Amol breaks open the lock of the woman's house and finds that it is abandoned. The woman appears in front of Amol and tells him that Neha is perfectly fine, and Amol discovers her dead body.
62	62	"Devices to identify psychic energy"
Irfan talks about instruments used to identify paranormal activity. Revathy and Satish feel the presence of someone in their new house, so they call Avinash to check the house for negative energy. Avinash finds a skeleton inside the wall. Avinash helps police identify the skeleton and then contacts the spirit of the girl. The spirit tells her story. Avinash helps the police in finding the culprit, Chunnilal.
63	63	"Power of mind"
Irfan talks about Deepak, whose wife finds him dead in his room. The forensic doctor tells the inspector that the rod was coiled thrice after entering Deepak's throat. The inspector spots the killer's footprints and follows them. The inspector makes Sarang reveal that he can bend metals without touching them. Sarang breaks the lock with his powers and escapes.
64	64	"Autowriting"
Irfan talks about Nikhil of Indore. Nikhil sees some criminal activities and is killed. Renu and Ashok see that Richa has written a few words on a paper. Feroza Belimoria tells Renu and Ashok that Nikhil's spirit might have entered Richa. Richa writes on a wall that Ashok's factory will burn down that night and Ashok's life is in danger. Ranvir tells Ashok that he killed Nikhil before trying to kill him. Renu goes to the factory along with the police and rescues Ashok.
65	65	"Monkey Man"
Ghaziabad residents talk about the monkey man. Ajit gets furious when he learns about his sister's relationship. Madhu's marriage is fixed with Neeraj and Ajit warns Vikas to stay away from her. On Madhu's engagement, the monkey man attacks her. The doctor informs Ajit that Madhu requires cosmetic surgery to reconstruct her face but Vikas's mother calls off the engagement. Ajit decides to catch the monkey man. Ajit's wife finds a ring left by the monkey man when he was escaping from the crime scene. The ring turns out to be the engagement ring given to Neeraj, whom the police arrest.
66	66	"Bijoya is treated like a God by the villagers"
Irfantells the story about the couple Bijoya and Mahen. Mahen spots Bijoya's hunger for blood at night, who starts longing for blood. Bijoya is treated like a God by the villagers, who offer sacrifices to her.
67	67	"Dr. M P Goyal is killed by the police"
Irfan talks about a person researching a medicine to turn immortal. The researchers suspect Dr. M P Goyal behind trying to steal stem cells to make the medicine. Dr. M P Goyal kills Dr. Shrivastav. and is killed by the police.
68	68	"Both sides of numerology"
Irfan talks both sides of numerology. A person is found dead in hotel room number six. Tanya is found dead in her room, and Vikram's twin brother Vineet is found guilty of her murder.
69	69	"Surekha insists a postmortem on her father-in-law"
Irfan talks about mortuaries where the dead come back to life. Prakash notices dead bodies coming back to life. Irfan labels Surekha greedy. Surekha is worried about her father-in-law's money when he is on his death bed. Surekha insists on a postmortem on her father-in-law to know about the property share, and lodges a complaint to conduct a postmortem on her father-in-law. Surekha's father-in-law comes back to life, and she is admitted to the mental asylum.
70	70	"The witches"
Irfan talks about the witches. The priest Mahesh Saikya's wife wants him to start a business as his present profession is not earning enough money. A stranger asks the priest to meet him near a tree, where Banumati, a witch, resides to help him earn money. Mahesh Saikya finds a cross mark on the door and is found dead in the tree. The stranger insists Mahesh Saikya's friend Pratap meet him near the tree at zero hour to know about Mahesh Saikya's killer. Pratap is also found dead in the tree. The villagers learn of Banumati's involvement behind all the killings in the village and burn her to death.
71	71	"Baldev Sharma's entire house starts bleeding"
Irfan narrates Baldev Sharma's story. He is concerned about his two daughters' marriage. Baldev Sharma tries to sell his house to Gupta, who sees blood oozing out of the room and flees from the house. Baldev Sharma's entire house starts bleeding.
72	72	"Anuradha claims that she is Alok's wife"
Irfan talks about a never ending story. Alok and his wife Payal are on their way back home after a party hit a girl with the car. Alok and Payal bring the girl home to avoid police involvement. She suffers memory loss. The girl's parents lodge a police complaint about her missing. Payal suspects Alok is having an affair with the girl. The girl identifies herself as Anuradha, and claims to be Alok's wife. Alok threatens to kill Anuradha like how he did in the previous birth while the police interfere.
73	73	"Pakhi gets attacked by ghosts in her dreams"
Pakhi has a bad dream about ghosts attacking her. She wakes up in fear and her husband Lohit finds bruises on her face and hands. Lohith takes her to a tantric who tells her about a Hazarika family who died in a car crash suspecting they might be the one disturbing her. Lohit gets angry and takes her home. Pakhi visits Hazarika's house and finds a lady who tells her that she was in love with Lohit and planned to get married but failed because of her, so she took the help of spirits to punish her. They visit the tantric again who advise them to leave Guwahati.
74	74	"Varsha has visions of the future on her thumbnail"
Varsha has a vision on her thumbnail about her dance teacher's death, who later dies in the same manner. Varsha starts wearing a glove on her hand. Years later, she removes the glove, and has a vision about an engagement being cancelled. She tells her mother about her visions but she tells her that it might be her imagination. She later has a vision of her father's death by electrocution. She stops him from going out, but months later, her father dies after getting electrocuted. Out of pain and helplessness, Varsha decides to chop off her thumb.
75	75	"Shruti gets attacked by someone in her college and goes into a coma"
Shruti is attacked by someone in her college. She gets admitted to the hospital and her father, Desai, plans revenge. The police suspect Rudraksh, one of Shruti's classmates who believes in Raavan's writings and liked Shruti. Rudraksh says he is innocent and he can rescue Shruti from the coma with the help of his mentor. He tells Desai to chant a prayer near Shruti for 21 days. Shruti gets up from the coma.
76	76	"A person witnesses a ghost while driving from Jaipur to Alwar"
A person witnesses a ghost while driving from Jaipur to Alwar, who tells him he wants to meet Bunty Chawla. The next day Bunty and his wife travel on the same road towards Alwar to visit her sister who is Vivek's widow. While driving back to Jaipur alone, he witnesses the ghost. He gets scared and calls his wife and tells her to give half of the factory to Vivek's wife and daughter. Vivek's ghost kills Bunty.
77	77	"Cursed diamond"
Irfan talks about a rare cursed diamond. Ranvijay marries Anita and brings her to India, but his grandfather warns Ranvijay and Anita to stay away from the cursed diamond. Anita orders Ranvijay to make a necklace with the diamond. As soon as Anita wears the cursed diamond, she miscarries. Ranvijay instructs the jeweller to destroy the diamond, but the jeweller dies in the process.

=== Season 2 ===
No. overall	No. in season	Title
78	1	"Khoon Ke Aansu"
Rashida, a residence of Patna, cries tears of blood when she is in pain. Everyone believes it is the presence of spirits and keeps their distance from her, but Mohammad Aslam marries her. It is believed that Rashida's prayers for others are always accepted.
79	2	TBA
Appa dies from a heart attack, but he calls out Vertaka's name. Ananda, who works for Lakshmi, practice bhoota aradhana. Ananda blesses Appa and brings him back to life. Appa had several concerns like building a temple for bhootas, Sundara's marriage, and his house debt.
80	3	TBA
Mishal talks about people who have a habit of staying in a cemetery called Aghori. In Varanasi, Arun is trying to find his elder brother who has been missing for five days. The elder brother was murdered and his dead body was found by Aghori who performed the last rites. Arun meets the Aghori, who informs him that his elder brother is no more, and shows him his watch as proof.
81	4	TBA
Jayashree Mande sees spirits. She sees her dead father feeding her son, and her mother-in-law who comes to meet her even though she is in a coma for all the other common people.
82	5	TBA
Mishal talks about Om and his bike. Many years ago Om had with an accident with his bike. He and his bike are worshipped by travellers for their safe journey, and helps people who want his support. A couple has an accident, but Om takes care of them.
83	6	TBA
Mishal talks about Prahalad who stopped ingesting food and water.
84	7	TBA
Bihar's small village Nehara is said to be a place where people do not marry. Many years back a girl named Suman was married to Manoj. After marriage, her behaviour changes, and Manoj's uncle warns the family that there is a spirit's power in their house.
85	8	TBA
Manoj's uncle persuades Manoj's mother to perform a ritual in order to destroy the evil spirit. However, during the ritual, Manoj and his dad interfere and it is stopped. When Manoj confronts Suman she warns him that if he reveals her truth, he will lose Suman forever. Manoj's uncle and the other villagers oppose Manoj and his family, and the spirit inside Suman speaks up and leaves Suman's body.
86	9	TBA
Villagers of Pune tell Patil that someone steals human bones from the cemetery; Patil arranges a ritual ceremony by a priest to get rid of this problem. A doctor tells everyone that Radha is behind stealing human bones to make medicine. Radha is haunted by a woman's spirit, and when the priest helps her the spirit is given salvation.
87	10	TBA
Kamini meets Gopal Katik who is suffering from a financial crisis; with her help and advice he gets out of it. He marries her and takes her to his mother, who follows her and identifies that she is a spirit, known as Karna Peshachani. Gopal disbelieves his mother at first when she informs him that Kamini is a spirit. With the help of a priest, he is saved from Kamini, but loses his assets and lives a simple life.
88	11	TBA
In Chitai, Chaudhary blames a priest for stealing a gold piece. The priest insists he is innocent, but Chaudhary orders him to pay the money. The priest owes Goolu Devta, where devotees write their wish on a stamp paper and tie it. A suspicious man returns this gold piece to Chaudhary.
89	12	TBA
Celebrity actor Divya Dutta suffers from claustrophobia. She and her brother share their experiences about hypnosis.
90	13	TBA
In Belui, West Bengal, villagers have a belief that if a child had evil spirits in them, they should be married with a dog.
91	14	TBA
Mishal talks about a village called Kalyanpur in Bihar, where bats are worshipped as gods.
92	15	TBA
Mishal talks about a village called Kungher in Gujrat, where Chudel Mata is worshiped.
93	16	TBA
Mishal Raheja talks about a village called Begunkodar in West Bengal, where trains never stop. Villagers say that a woman was crushed by a train and her soul haunts the station.
94	17	TBA
Mahesh Thakur talks about astral travel. Mahesh shares an incident he faced where no one believed him.
95	18	TBA
Mishal talks about a man named Sanjay who lives in a village called Seoni near Nagpur and has a huge abdomen. He experiences immense pain and is rushed to a hospital. Doctors find twenty litres of thick fluid and a teratoma in his abdomen.
96	19	TBA
Mishal talks about Ashwini Kumar, a time travel expert who can look into a man's past and future. A boy named Amit goes missing on his birthday. His parents meet Ashwini, who inform that that Amit was murdered. Ashwini advised Amit's parents to call the police. The murderer is a man who gave Amit a lift that day.
97	20	TBA
Mishal talks about crystal healing. Indra Ghildiyal suffers from many disorders due to which she was unable to conceive. She meets Poonam Singh, a crystal healer who cures her patients with crystal stone and reiki.
98	21	TBA
Mishal talks about a village called Sindkhed Raja in Maharashtra, where Hajrat Asad Baba licks wounds to heal them.
99	22	TBA
Mishal talks about Barah Devi Mandir located in Kanpur.
100	23	TBA
Mishal Raheja talks about auto writing.
101	24	TBA
Mishal talks about dreams, and Shekhar Suman and Muskaan Mihani share their dreams.
102	25	TBA
Mishal introduces a Wiccan, Neha Lalwani. Neha shares her experience of how she became a Wiccan.
