= Siddharth Kak =

Indian film director, TV producer, and presenter

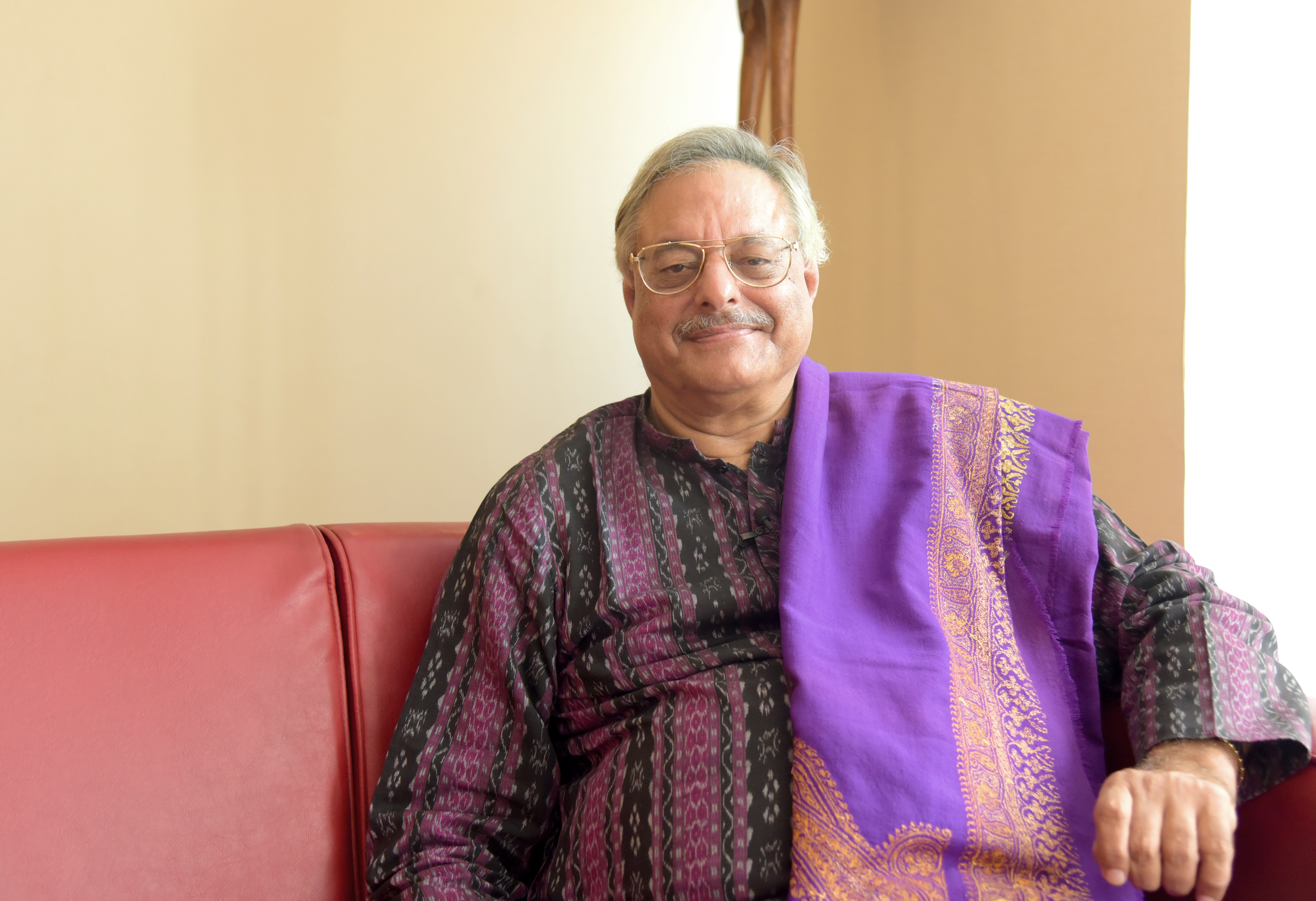
- Years active: 1972–present
- Spouse: Gita Siddharth
- Children: Antara Kak

Siddharth Kak is an Indian documentary maker, television producer, and presenter, best known as the producer and presenter of Surabhi (1990–2001). Subsequently, Kak established the 'Surabhi Foundation' with the assistance of Ford Foundation and started a project on preserving cultural artefacts.

== Early life ==
Siddharth is the grandson of Ram Chandra Kak, a Kashmiri Pandit. He was educated at Lawrence School, Sanawar and subsequently graduated from St. Stephen's College, Delhi.

== Career ==
Kak currently hosts the travel show Indiadhanush on NDTV Imagine with actress Ami Trivedi.

== Personal life ==
Kak was married to actress Gita Siddharth until her death in 2019. Their daughter, Antara Kak, is a documentary filmmaker.

== Filmography ==
Year	Film	Director	Producer	Writer	Notes
1987	Raj Kapoor	Yes		Yes	
1993	Surabhi		Yes		
2006	Mano Ya Na Mano		Yes		

=== As an actor ===
Year	Films	Roles	Notes
1979	The Great Monkey Rip-Off	Superintendent	
1980	Sau Din Saas Ke	Sheela's Husband	
1981	Bulundi	CBI Inspector Salim Shirazi	
1981	Daasi	Eye Specialist	
1982	Arth	Anil	
1982	Suraag	Paul Khanna	
1987	Mr. India	Chief officer CBI (uncredited)	
2020	Love Aaj Kal 2	Harshwardhan Mehta	

=== As an actor on TV ===
Year	Title	Roles	Notes
1984	The Jewel in the Crown (TV series)	Rajendra Singh	Episode: Crossing the River
2022	Crash Course (2021 webseries)	Batra	

== Works ==
- Looking in, looking out. Writers Workshop, 1975. ISBN 0892531169.
- Surabhi Ke Sau Sawaal. Rupa & Co. 2005. ISBN 81-291-0544-6.
- Love, Exile, Redemption. Rupa Publications India. 2023. ISBN 9357024921.
