= Nandini Sundar =

Social Sciences Activist

Prof. Dr. Nandini Sundar Ph.D. (Columbia) (1995)
- Born: 22 September 1967 (age 59)
- Occupations: Professor, Delhi School of Economics
- Years active: Twenty-first century
- Known for: Social anthropology
- Title: Prof. Dr.
- Spouse: Siddharth Varadarajan
- Awards: Infosys Prize for Social Sciences (2010)

Academic background
- Education: B.A. (Oxford), M.A. (Columbia), Ph.D. (Columbia)
- Alma mater: Somerville College, Oxford (England); Columbia University, New York City (United States)
- Thesis: In search of Gunda Dhur: Colonialism and contestation in Bastar, Central India, 1854-1993 (1995)
- Doctoral advisor: Katherine Newman
- Other advisor: David Lelyveld
- Website: nandinisundar.blogspot.com

Nandini Sundar (born 22 September 1967) is an Indian professor of sociology at the Delhi School of Economics whose research interests include political sociology, law, and inequality. She is a recipient of the Infosys Prize for Social Sciences in 2010, and of the Ester Boserup Prize for Development Research in 2016.

== Education ==
Sundar obtained a Bachelor of Arts degree in Philosophy, Politics and Economics from Somerville College, Oxford in 1989 and Master of Arts, Master of Philosophy and Ph.D. in Anthropology from Columbia University in 1989, 1991 and 1995, respectively.

== Human rights work ==
In 2007, Sundar along with others filed public interest litigation against human rights violations in Chhattisgarh, arising out of the Salwa Judum vigilante movement. In 2011, the Supreme Court of India banned Salwa Judum, ordered compensation for all those affected, and investigation and prosecution of those responsible. It also ordered the disbanding and disarming of Special Police Officers, many of whom were underage youth who had been armed by the state to fight Naxalites.

In October 2016, the Central Bureau of Investigation on the Supreme Court's orders in the ongoing case filed by Sundar and others, filed chargesheets against seven Special Police Officers and 26 Salwa Judum leaders for their role in the burning of three villages in the Sukma district in March 2011 and the attack on Swami Agnivesh. The arson had allegedly been accompanied by rapes and murders of villagers.

Almost immediately afterwards, the police burnt effigies of Sundar and other activists, and the Bastar police filed a first information report against her on 4 November 2016, as an alleged co-conspirator in the murder of Shamnath Baghel, a tribal in the Sukma district of Chattisgargh. The wife of the victim told a national television channel, NDTV, that she had not named anyone, after police cited her complaint to allege Sundar and another professor were suspects.

The National Human Rights Commission summoned the IGP of Bastar Range SRP Kalluri and Chhattisgarh Chief Secretary for retaliation, and has said there was no apparent connection between the visit of Sundar and other human rights activists and the murder of Shamnath Baghel. The Indian Supreme Court recorded the Chhattisgarh government's statement that they would not arrest or investigate Sundar, and ruled that if the Chhattisgarh state government wanted to undertake any investigation, they should give four weeks' notice during which time Sundar and others could approach the Court. Eventually, her name was dropped by the Chhattisgarh police from the murder case in February 2019, after the change of government in Chhattisgarh, citing 'lack of evidence'.

== Advocacy ==
Sundar has long been outspoken about the issue of academic freedom. In 2019, she told Times Higher Education that the blackout in Kashmir had been a "devastating blow," that the situation has worsened nationwide since Modi's election in 2014, and that the lack of liberties could harm India's attempts at climbing university rankings.

In summer 2020, she submitted a paper on academic freedom to the United Nations.

== Allegation of incitement and fake identity during fact-finding visit (2016) ==
In May 2016, Nandini Sundar accompanied a fact-finding team to villages in the Bastar region of Chhattisgarh. The state police alleged that she entered under a false name (Richa Keshav), held meetings in tribal villages where she supposedly encouraged locals to oppose the police and align with the insurgents, and thereby instigated unrest.

== Publications ==
Selected publications of Sundar include:

- The Burning Forest: India's War in Bastar (Juggernaut Press, 2016),
- The Scheduled Tribes and their India (edited volume, OUP, 2016),
- Civil Wars in South Asia: State, Sovereignty, Development (Sage 2014, co-edited),
- Subalterns and Sovereigns: An Anthropological History of Bastar (2nd ed 2007, 1997),
- Branching Out: Joint Forest Management in India (co-authored, OUP, 2001),
- Legal Grounds: Natural Resources, Identity and the Law in Jharkhand (edited OUP, 2009),
- Anthropology in the East: The founders of Indian sociology and anthropology (co-edited, Permanent Black, 2007)
- A New Moral Economy for India's Forests (co-edited, Sage, 1999)

== Personal life ==
Sundar is married to Siddharth Varadarajan, former chief editor of The Hindu—an Indian English-language national newspaper—and a founding editor of The Wire. Her parents, S Sundar and Pushpa Sundar were both Indian Administrative Service officers of the Gujarat cadre belonging to the 1963 batch.
