= Kamadhenu (Dharwad) =

- Village
- Country: India
- State: Karnataka
- District: Dharwad
- Talukas: Kalghatgi

Government
  - Type: Panchayat raj
  - Body: Gram panchayat

Population (2011)
  - Total: 1,772

Languages
  - Official: Kannada
- Time zone: UTC+5:30 (IST)
- ISO 3166 code: IN-KA
- Vehicle registration: KA
- Website: karnataka.gov.in

Kamadhenu (Dharwad) is a village in the southern state of Karnataka, India. It is located in the Kalghatgi taluk of Dharwad district in Karnataka.

== Demographics ==
As of the 2011 Census of India there were 407 households in Kamadhenu and a total population of 1,772 consisting of 923 males and 849 females. There were 192 children ages 0-6.

== See also ==
- Dharwad
- Districts of Karnataka
