= Kamdhenu Yojna =

Kamdhenu Yojna is a dairy scheme introduced in the year 2013 in Uttar Pradesh to surpass the low availability of high yielding germ plasm animals in Uttar Pradesh. Its Kamdhenu, Mini Kamdhenu and Micro Kamdhenu version were started by the Animal husbandry department of Uttar Pradesh Government. The state government has launched Kamdhenu Dairy Scheme which envisions establishment of 100 high yielding animal units sourced from outside Uttar Pradesh. Entrepreneurs are provided with interest free loan and subsidy. Through the scheme more than 1000 dairy farms of 100, 50 and 25 cattle have been established in Uttar Pradesh. National Dairy Plan (NDP) of the National Dairy Development Board (NDDB) comes under the unit of Uttar Pradesh.

== Background ==
With the production of 241.939 lacs M.T. of milk during the year 2013–14, Uttar Pradesh is the largest milk producing state in India. Still the average capacity of milk yielding animals is low in comparison to other states mainly, the reason being less availability of high yielding germ plasm animals in the state. Hence the need for Kamdhenu Yojna, which would ensure availability of high yielding animals to the farmers

== Objective ==
- To safeguard creation and accessibility of high quality milk producing animals in Uttar Pradesh.
- To thrive high yielding germ plasm milk producing animals in Uttar Pradesh.
- To make sure the accessibility to farmers of high milk yielding animals in the state.
- Mini Kamdhenu & Micro Kamdhenu Scheme has been brought in existence to ensure assistance to the small and marginal farmers as well.
