= Business Line =

Daily business newspaper in India

- Front page
- Type: Daily newspaper
- Format: Broadsheet
- Owner(s): Kasturi & Sons Limited
- Publisher: The Hindu Group
- Editor: Raghuvir Srinivasan
- Founded: 1994
- Political alignment: Pro-business
- Language: English
- Headquarters: Kasturi Buildings, 859 & 860, Anna Salai, Chennai, Tamil Nadu, India 600002
- Circulation: 1,08,000
- ISSN: 0971-7528
- OCLC number: 456162874
- Website: www.thehindubusinessline.com
- Free online archives: epaper.thehindubusinessline.com

The Hindu Business Line, known as Business Line, is an Indian business newspaper published by Kasturi & Sons, the publishers of the newspaper The Hindu, which is headquartered in Chennai, India. The newspaper covers priority industry verticals, such as agriculture, aviation, automotive, IT, in weekly specials.

The paper is printed at 17 centres across India, reaching metros as well as emerging Tier I and Tier II cities. Business Line has a daily circulation of 1,17,000 copies, per the Audit Bureau of Circulation in 2016.

== See also ==
- List of newspapers in India
