= Surabhi (TV series) =

- Genre: Culture magazine show
- Created by: Siddharth Kak
- Directed by: Abhilash Bhattacharya
- Presented by: Siddharth Kak, Renuka Shahane
- Theme music composer: L. Subramaniam
- Country of origin: India
- Original language: Hindi
- No. of seasons: 9
- No. of episodes: 415

Production
- Producer: Siddharth Kak
- Production company: Cinema Vision India

Original release
- Network: DD National; Star Plus
- Release: 1990 – 2001

Surabhi ("Fragrance") was an Indian cultural magazine show hosted by Renuka Shahane and Siddharth Kak, which ran from 1990 to 2001 with a year's break in 1991. It was initially telecast on the state-run television channel Doordarshan, and later moved to Star Plus in the Sunday morning slot. Surabhi was produced by Kak's Mumbai-based production house Cinema Vision India. Its theme was Indian culture. The show is India's longest-running cultural series and features in the Limca Book of Records for receiving the largest measured audience response ever in the history of Indian television.

== History ==
The title music of Surabhi was composed by Indian composer and classical violinist L. Subramaniam. Indian cooperative dairy giant Amul sponsored it for a long time, and the show was titled Amul Surabhi.

One of the reasons of its popularity was the weekly quiz open for viewer participation. Being the early 90s, mobile phones and the Internet did not exist in India; so viewers were asked to post their responses using the 15 paise postcard of India post. According to the Limca Book of Records, the show once received the highest ever documented response in the history of Indian television – over 1.4 million letters in a single week. The Indian postal department was forced to issue a different category of postcards called "Competition Postcards" priced at 2 Rupees each for participating in such contests.

During the 1990s, Surabhi had become a benchmark show and is known as "one of the best television shows ever made that reflected the length and breadth of the Indian culture". Subsequently, Kak established the Surabhi Foundation with the assistance of Ford Foundation and started a project on preserving cultural artifacts.

== See also ==
- 7 RCR (TV Series)
- Samvidhaan (TV Series)
- Satyamev Jayate (TV series)
- Pradhanmantri (TV Series)
- Television shows based on Indian history
