= N. Murali =

Director of The Hindu Group Publishing (P) Ltd. and of Kasturi and Sons Ltd

Narasimhan Murali
- Born: 10 May 1946 (age 80)
- Education: Chartered Accountant
- Alma mater: Loyola College, Chennai
- Employer(s): Kasturi and Sons Limited (KSL)
- Known for: Publisher of The Hindu Group
- Title: Director of The Hindu Group Publishing (P) Ltd. and Director, Kasturi and Sons Ltd.
- Spouse: Tara Murali
- Children: Krishna Murali, Kanta Murali

Narasimhan Murali (born 10 May 1946) is currently Director of The Hindu Group Publishing Private Limited that publishes The Hindu and other allied publications. He is also the Director of the holding company, Kasturi and Sons limited.

== Career ==
In a career spanning over four decades Murali handled all non-editorial and business functions focussing on finance, advertisement, circulation, administration and other commercial aspects. Posts held in Newspaper and Media Industry bodies: President of the Indian Newspaper Society (INS) - (1983–84) Chairman, Council of Management, Audit Bureau of Circulations (ABC) (1996–97); chairman, National Readership Studies Council (NRSC) (1998-2000); chairman, Board of Governors, Advertising Standards Council of India (ASCI) (2003–04) Elected as first board member from South Asia of IFRA, Darmstadt, Germany (the world's leading association for media publishing) (1998-2004); Member of the Board of World Association of Newspapers(WAN), Paris (2005–06) Chairman, Board of Trustees of Press Institute of India – RIND (May 2003-Sept.2010). Conferred "Distinguished Service Award" by the Advertising Club Chennai in 1995 for contribution to Advertising.

== Other interests ==
Trustee of The Music Academy, Madras (up to 6 November 2005); Currently, President of The Music Academy, Madras, (from November 2005) in Chennai He has held administrative positions as chairman, Finance Committee and a vice-president of the Tamil Nadu Cricket Association President, Tamil Nadu Tennis Association, (1994–96) Trustee, Media Development Foundation, Chennai; Member of the Board of Governors of Thiagarajar School of Management (Affiliated to Madurai Kamaraj University), Madurai, Tamil Nadu.

== Personal life ==
Murali was married to Tara, an architect. She passed away on July 26, 2025. They have two children.
