= Surabhi foundation =

Coordinates: 28°37′54.4″N 77°13′37.1″E

Surabhi Foundation
- Founded: 2009
- Type: not-for-profit
- Purpose: Poverty Alleviation, Health and Nutrition, Self-employment
- Location: Delhi, India
- Region served: India

Surabhi Foundation (abbreviated as SuFo, Hindi सुरभि) is a registered not-for-profit organisation working for improvement of socio-economic condition of farmers and artisans in rural India. SuFo works for a healthy and equitable self-reliant society. This is brought about by accomplishing rural prosperity and growth through adopting environmentally harmonious farming systems, utilizing local natural resources and availing non farming opportunities integrating indigenous and global knowledge, people-centered development and empowerment approach.

== Activities ==
Surabhi Foundation is dedicated towards its mission by conducting following activities.

Sustainable Rural Development

- Farmer Development
- Employment Generation
- Education
- Livestock Development
- Entrepreneurship Development
- Renascence

Urban Health

- Natural Food
- Desi Cow Milk

Improving socio-economic status of women

== Projects ==
- Rural Empowerment Project - Bundelkhand
- Handmade Paper Renasance Project - Kalpi Project
- Cow Breed Development - Uttarakhand Project
