= The Hindu Group =

Indian publishing company

The Hindu Group is an Indian publishing company based in Chennai, Tamil Nadu; which is owned by Kasturi and Sons Limited, a company whose ownership is held by the descendants of Kasturi Ranga Iyengar, the individual who acquired their first publication The Hindu, a daily newspaper in 1878.

== Hindu Group Publications ==
The Hindu Group publishes a number of newspapers, magazines and other journals.

- The Hindu – National Daily Newspaper
- The Hindu Business Line – Business Daily
- Sportstar – Weekly Sports magazine
- Frontline – Fortnightly magazine
- Survey of Indian Industry – An annual review on Indian Industries
- Survey of Indian Agriculture – An annual review on Indian Agriculture
- Survey of the Environment – An annual review of the Environment
- Indian Cricket – An annual record book on Cricket
- The Hindu Index – Monthly and Cumulated Annual
- The Hindu (Tamil) – Tamil language daily
- Kamadenu – Weekly Tamil Magazine
- RoofandFloor.com - a Chennai-focussed real-estate portal

=== Special Publications ===
Special Publications under the series The Hindu Speaks on Libraries: Information Technology, Management, Education, Religious Values, Music, etc.

One of their special publication was from the pages of The Hindu—The Last 200 Days of Mahatma Gandhi

=== Former Publications ===
- NDTV Hindu – Chennai based English and Tamil news channel (now stopped)
