= List of people from Kerala =

The following is a list of notable people from Kerala, India. The names are classified according to the person's major area of work. For more details please see their respective articles.

== Monarchs ==
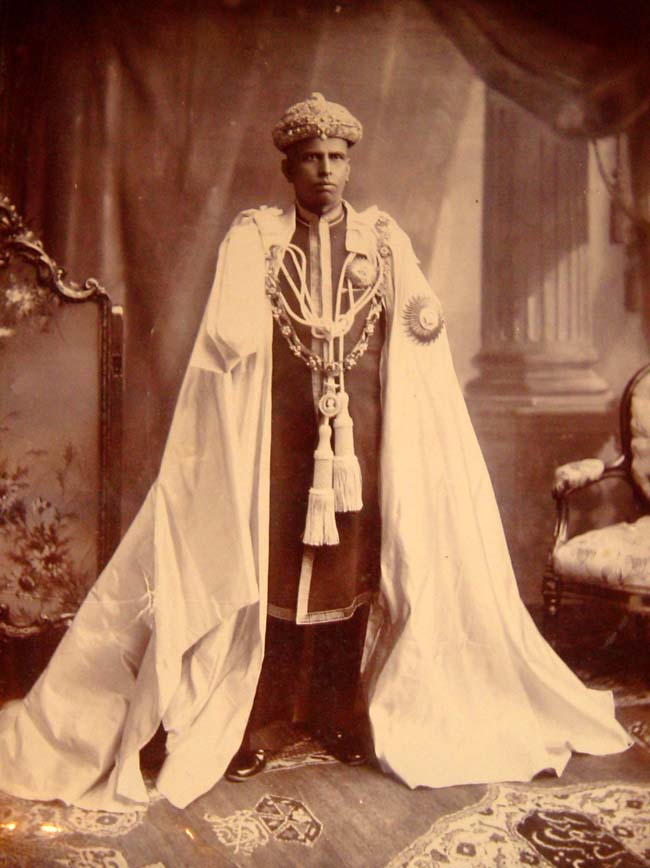
H H Rama Varma XV

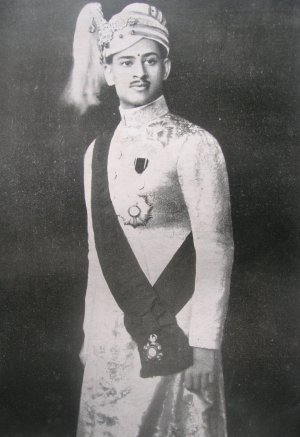
Chithira Thirunal Balarama Varma

=== Early Cheras ===
The Cheras are referred to as Kedalaputo (Sanskrit: "Kerala Putra") in the Emperor Ashoka's Pali edicts (3rd century BCE). The earliest Graeco-Roman accounts referring to the Cheras are by Pliny the Elder in the 1st century CE, in the Periplus of the 1st century CE, and by Claudius Ptolemy in the 2nd century CE. Greeks and Romans are called "Yavanas" in early Indian literature.

- Uthiyan Cheralathan – earliest known ruler of the Chera family who was also known as "Vanavaramban" Cheral Athan. He is sometimes identified with the Chera ruler who prepared food for the warring cousins at Kurukshetra War in the epic Mahabharata (Akananuru).
- Nedum Cheralathan – Imayavaramban Nedum Cheral Athan, son of Uthiyan Cheral Athan, is the hero of the second decade of Pathitrupathu which was composed by the poet Kaveri Poompattanatthu Kaari Kannanar. The greatest of his enemies were the Kadambas whom he defeated in battles. He also attacked Yavana ships and held Yavana traders ransom.
- Pallaana Chel Kelu Kuttuvan – son of Uthiyan Cheral Athan. Credited as the conqueror of Kongu.
- Kalankakkanni Narmudi Cheral – led an expedition against the Adigaiman Anji of Tagadur. Initially defeated by Nannan of Ezhimala in the battle of Pazhi, later defeated and killed Nannan in the battle of Vakai Perum Turai.
- Chenguttuvan – identified with "Kadal Pirakottiya" Vel Kezhu Kuttuvan, son of Nedum Cheral Athan, celebrated by the poet Paranar in the 5th decade, ascended to the Chera throne after the death of his father. Vel Kezhu Kuttuvan is often identified with the legendary "Chenguttuvan Chera", the most illustrious ruler of the Early Cheras. Under his reign, the Chera territory extended from Kollimalai (near Karur Vanchi) in the east to Thondi and Mantai (Kerala) on the western coast.
- Adu Kottu Cheral Athan – successor of Vel Kezhu Kuttuvan
- Chelva Kadumko Valia Athan – son of Anthuvan Cheral and the hero of the 7th set of poems composed by Kapilar. He defeated the combined armies of the Pandyas and the Cholas. He is sometimes identified as the Ko Athan Cheral Irumporai mentioned in the Aranattar-malai inscription of Pugalur (c. 2nd century CE).
- Perum Cheral Irumporai – "Tagadur Erinta" defeated the combined armies of the Pandyas, Cholas and that of the chief of Tagadur. He captured Tagadur which was ruled by the powerful ruler Adigaman Ezhni. He is also called "the lord of Puzhinadu" and "the lord of Kollimalai" and "the lord of [Poom]Puhar". Puhar was the Chola headquarters. Perum Cheral Irumporai also annexed the territories of a minor chief called Kaluval.
- Illam Cheral Irumporai – defeated the Pandyas and the Cholas and brought immense wealth to his base Vanchi.
- Yanaikatchai Mantaran Cheral Irumporai – ruled from Kollimalai (near Karur Vanchi) in the east to Thondi and Mantai on the western coast. He defeated his enemies in a battle at Vilamkil.
- Kanaikkal Irumporai – said to have defeated a chief called Muvan and imprisoned in him. The Chera then brutally pulled out the teeth of the prisoner and planted them on the gates of the city of Thondi. Upon capture by the Chola ruler Sengannan Kanaikkal committed suicide by starvation.

=== Kodungallur Cheras / Kulasekharas (Medieval Cheras) ===
- Kulashekhara Varma (c. 800–c.820 CE)
- Rajashekhara (c. 820–844 CE)
- Sthanu Ravi Varma (844–c. 885 CE)
- Rama Varma (c. 885–917 CE)
- Kota Ravi Varma (917–947 CE)
- Indu Kota Varma (944–962 CE)
- Bhaskara Ravi Varma I (962–1019 CE)
- Bhaskara Ravi Varma II (979–1021 CE)
- Vira Kerala (1021–c. 1028 CE)
- Rajasimha (c. 1028–c.1043 CE)
- Bhaskara Ravi Varma III (c. 1043–c.1082 CE)
- Ravi Rama Varma (c. 1082–1090 CE)

=== Venad Swaroopam (Later Cheras) ===
Rulers of Venad trace their origin to the Vel family related to the Ay chiefs of the ancient southern India (c. 1st - 4th century AD). Venad - ruled by hereditary chiefs, acting with the help of a military entourage - emerged as a chiefdom in the state of the Cheras of Kodungallur in c. 8th century.

- Rama Varma Kulashekhara (1090–1102) – mentioned in Rameswarathukoil Inscription as the founder of Venad as an independent state
- Kotha Varma Marthandam, Keezhperoor (1102–1125) – conquered Kottar and Nanjanad from the Pandya Dynasty
- Vira Kerala Varma I, Keezhperoor (1125–1145) – great religious benefactor, responsible for the rebuilding of Padmanabhaswamy and the endowment of Suchindram Temples
- Kodai Kerala Varma, Keezhperoor (1145–1150)
- Vira Ravi Varma, Keezhperoor (1161–1164)
- Vira Kerala Varma II, Keezhperoor (1164–1167)
- Vira Aditya Varma, Keezhperoor (1167–1173)
- Vira Udaya Martanda Varma, Keezhperoor (1173–1192) – established his seat at Kulikkod and allied himself to the Pandya kings
- Devadaram Vira Kerala Varma III, Keezhperoor (1192–1195)
- Vira Manikantha Rama Varma Tiruvadi, Keezhperoor (1195– ?)
- Vira Rama Kerala Varma Tiruvadi, Keezhperoor (1209–1214)
- Vira Ravi Kerala Varma Tiruvadi, Keezhperoor (1214–1240)
- Vira Padmanabha Martanda Varma Tiruvadi, Keezhperoor (1240–1252) – the Pandya kings asserted their dominance over Venad during his reign
- Jayasimha Deva, Keezhperoor (1266–1267) – succeeded in bringing the whole of present-day Kerala under his control. He established his seat at Kollam, the surrounding areas becoming known as Jayasimhanad (Desinganad). His wife Rani Umma Devi was probably a joint ruler with her husband. He died leaving several sons who quarrelled with his nephews over the succession, causing a long and disruptive civil war.
- Ravi Varma, Keezhperoor (1299–1313)
- Vira Udaya Martanda Varma, Keezhperoor (1313–1333)
- Aditya Varma Tiruvadi, Keezhperoor (1333–1335)
- Vira Rama Udaya Martanda Varma Tiruvadi, Keezhperoor (1335–1342)
- Vira Kerala Varma Tiruvadi, Keezhperoor (1342–1363)
- Vira Martanda Varma III, Keezhperoor (1363–1366)
- Vira Rama Martanda Varma, Keezhperoor (1366–1382)
- Vira Ravi Varma, Keezhperoor (1383–1416)
- Vira Ravi Ravi Varma, Keezhperoor (1416–1417)
- Vira Kerala Martanda Varma, Keezhperoor (1383)
- Chera Udaya Martanda Varma, Keezhperoor (1383–1444)
- Vira Ravi Varma, Keezhperoor (1444–1458)
- Sankhara Sri Vira Rama Martanda Varma (1458–1468)
- Vira Kodai Sri Aditya Varma (1468–1484) – established his capital at Kallidaikurichi
- Vira Ravi Ravi Varma (1484–1503) – established his capital at Padmanabhapuram
- Martanda Varma, Kulasekhara Perumal (1503–1504)
- Vira Ravi Kerala Varma, Kulasekhara Perumal (1504–1528) – succeeded as Trippappur Mutta Tiruvadi

=== Mushika Kingdom (Ezhimalai) ===
The Mushika kingdom was a kingdom in the early historic south India in present-day Kerala, India, ruled by a royal dynasty of the same name. Its dominions, for most of its recorded history, covered the present-day regions of northern Kerala, Tulunadu and Coorg (southern Karnataka), between the western slopes of the Western Ghats in the east and the Arabian Sea in the west.

- Nannan I - married the daughter of the Chera King Perunchorruthiyan sometime around the 3rd Century BCE. Sangam texts as well as several versions of the Mahabharata cite a Chera king by the same name to have fed the rival armies in the Great War. Under Nannan, an able military commander also, Mushika kingdom transformed into a force in South India, and stretched into Wynad and Gudalur Districts in the foothills of the Western Ghats, and the northern parts of present-day Coimbatore district, Tamil Nadu. Eager to expand his kingdom, Nannan waged war against the Cheras, and successfully defeated the Chera commanders at the Battle of Pazhi.
- Isanavarman – married a Chedi princess Nandini. He also married the daughter of the then Chola King. Their son Nrpurama was the next king.
- Virochana – defeated the Pallavas, and married Harini, the daughter of the Pallava King.
- Kandan Kari Varman – (The Mushika king who lived in the Eleventh Century CE) is referred to as a close relative of the Ay-Chera King Vira Kerala. Several inscriptions exist in both the Kasargod-Kannur area (in Eramam) and in the Thiruvananthapuram-Kanyakumari area, throwing light on the synchronism between Rajendra Chola, Chera Vira Kerala and Kandan Kari Varman and that the latter Mushika King belonged to the Ay Dynasty.

=== Kola Swarupam ===
Kolattunādu (Kola Swarupam, as Kingdom of Cannanore in foreign accounts, Chirakkal (Chericul) in later times) was one of the three most powerful feudal kingdoms on the Malabar Coast during the arrival of Portuguese India Armadas, the others being Zamorin's Calicut and Quilon. The Kolathiris are praised as Vadakkan Perumals ("Kings of the North") by the noted "Keralolpathi".

- Rama Ghata Mushaka – established the lineage of Kola Swarupam;
- Vikrama Rama an inscription dating to 929 AD mentions about one Vikrama Rama identifiable with the ruler Vikrama Rama who appears in the Mushika Vamsa
- Udaya Varma, also known as "Rama Ghata Muvar" – mentioned on the inscription from 10th century AD
- Eraman Chemani (Rama Jayamani) – the inscription from the Tiruvattur temple mentions him to be identifiable as the king who appears as the 109th ruler in the Mushika Vamsa

=== Arrakal Kingdom ===
Arakkal kingdom (Kingdom of Cannanore, Sultanate of Laccadive and Cannanore) was a former city-state on the Malabar Coast, ruled by a dynasty of the same name. The ruling King was called Ali Raja ("the Sea Ruler") and the ruling queen was called Arakkal Beevi. The royal family is said to be originally a branch of the Kolattiri, descended from a princess of that family who converted to Islam. They owed allegiance to the Kolattiri rulers, whose ministers they had been at one time. The Arakkal family was the only Muslim royal family of Kerala to control parts of the coast and Lakshadweep.

- Ali Raja Ali II – known to have deployed his naval Mappila forces on behalf of the Mughal Emperor Aurangzeb during the Child's War

=== Samoothiri of Kozhikode ===
Zamorin of Calicut (Saamoothiri, സാമൂതിരി) – rulers of Malabar from the 14th and 18th century AD. At the peak of their reign, the Samoothiris ruled over a region from Kollam (Quilon) to Panthalayini Kollam (Koyilandy).

- Mana Vikrama (Manikkan) – legendary founder of the ruling family
- Mana Vikrama the Great – the Russian merchant of Tver Afanasy Nikitin (1468–1474) visited Kozhikode during his reign
- Mana Vikrama III – the expulsion of the Portuguese from Chaliyam (1571) by his forces
- Mana Vikrama (Saktan Tampuran) – uncle of the author of the Krishnanatakam
- Mana Veda – author of the Krishnanatakam
- Asvati Tirunal – his forces undertook the expulsion of Portuguese from Kodungallur (1662)
- Puratam Tirunal – Portuguese were expelled from Kochi under his reign (1663)
- Uttrattati Tirunal – ceded Chetwai to the Dutch
- Bharani Tirunal Mana Vikram – the terror of the Dutch; two Mamankams (1694 and 1695)
- Nileswaram Tirunal – adoptions from Nileswaram (1706 and 1707)
- Samoothiri from Kilakke Kovilakam (1741–1746)
- Putiya Kovilakam (1746–1758) – the Dutch War was fought during his term (1753–1758).
- Kilakke Kovilakam (1758–1766) – battles with Travancore and the invasion of Mysore; committed suicide; annexed by Mysore
- Putiya Kovilakam (1766–1788)
- Kerala Varma Vikrama (1788–1798) – Treaty of Seringapatam (1792)
- Krishna Varma (1798–1806) – agreement of 1806 with EIC (died in 1816)

=== Purannatt Swarupam (Cotiote Rajah) ===
- Kerala Varma Pazhassi Raja – known as the Lion of Kerala; a prince from the royal dynasty of Pazhassi Kottayam. He was the only person to defeat Arthur Wellesley, 1st Duke of Wellington in a war.

=== Kings of Travancore ===
In the 18th century, Marthanda Varma (1706–1758), of the Trippappoor, successfully developed the centralised state of Travancore. Varma routed all of major Nair nobles in Travancore, organised a standing army, defeated most of the chiefdoms in central Kerala, entered into strategic alliances with Europeans, supported Kerala merchants (Syrian Christian) in the place of the Europeans, and eventually formed one of the first modern states of southern India.

- Marthanda Varma Kulasekhara Perumal (1729–1758)
- Balarama Varma Kulasekhara Perumal – Dharma Raja Karthika Thirunal (1758–1798)
- Balarama Varma Kulasekhara Perumal (1798–1810)
- Gouri Laksmibhai Ranee (1810–1815)
- Gouri Parvathibhai Ranee (1815–1829)
- Swathi Thirunal Rama Varma Kulasekhara Perumal (1829–1847)
- Uthram Thirunal Marthanda Varma Maharaja (1847–1860)
- Ayilyam Thirunal Rama Varma Maharaja (1860–1880)
- Visakham Thirunal Rama Varma Maharaja (1880–1885)
- Shri Moolam Thirunal Maharajah (1885–1924)
- Sethu Laksmibhai Ranee (1924–1933)
- Shri Chithira Thirunal Balarama Varma Maharajah (1933–1949) – last King of Travancore; Rajpramukh of Thiru-Kochi

=== Dewan of Travancore ===
- Raja Kesavadas – Dewan of Travancore during the reign of Dharma Raja

=== Dewan of Malabar ===
- E.K Krishnan – Dewan of Malabar district, and Deputy Collector of state and district.

=== Kings of Cochin ===
- Unniraman Koikkal I (1500–1503)
- Veera Kerala Varma (1537–1565)
- Kesava Rama Varma (1565–1601)
- Rama Varma (1701–1721)
- Rama Varma Sakthan Thampuran (1790–1805)
- Rama Varma XV (1895–1914)
- Kerala Varma (1946–1948)
- Rama Varma Pareekshithu Thampuran (1948–1964) – last king of Cochin

=== Villarvattom Dynasty (vassal principality of the Kingdom of Cochin) ===
- King Thoma of Villarvattom.

== Heads of state ==
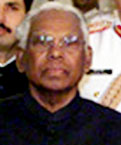
K.R. Narayanan, President of India (1997–2002)

=== President of India ===
- K.R. Narayanan – 10th President of India (1997–2002), 9th Vice-President of India (1992–1997)

=== President of Singapore ===
- Devan Nair – 3rd President of Singapore (1981–1985)

=== Prime Minister of Malaysia ===
- Mahathir Mohamad - 4th Prime Minister of Malaysia (1981–2003), (2018–2020)

== Parliament of India ==
=== Rajya Sabha ===
- P. J. Kurien – 18th deputy chairman of the Rajya Sabha (2012–2018)

=== Lok Sabha ===
- T. K. Viswanathan – Secretary General of the Lok Sabha (15th)

== Governors of states ==
- Pattom A. Thanu Pillai
  - fourth governor of Punjab, 1962–1964
  - fourth governor of Andhra Pradesh, 1964–1968
- P.C. Alexander
  - ninth governor of Tamil Nadu, 1988–1990
  - seventeenth governor of Maharashtra, 1993–2002
  - seventh governor of Goa, 1996–1998
- P V Cherian – eighth governor of Maharashtra, 1964–1969
- M. M. Jacob – ninth governor of Meghalaya, 1995–2007
- A. J. John, Anaparambil – fourth governor of Madras, 1956–1957
- M K Narayanan – 24th governor of West Bengal, 2010–2014
  - Madathilparampil Mammen Thomas Governor of Nagaland, 1990–1992
- Vakkom Purushothaman – eleventh governor of Mizoram, 2011–2014
- K. Sankaranarayanan – 21st governor of Maharashtra, 2010–2014
- K.K. Viswanathan – sixth governor of Gujarat, 1973–1978
- Kummanam Rajasekharan, BJP – 18th governor of Mizoram, 2018–2019
- P. S. Sreedharan Pillai, BJP – 19th governor of Mizoram, 2019–present

== Council of Ministers, India ==
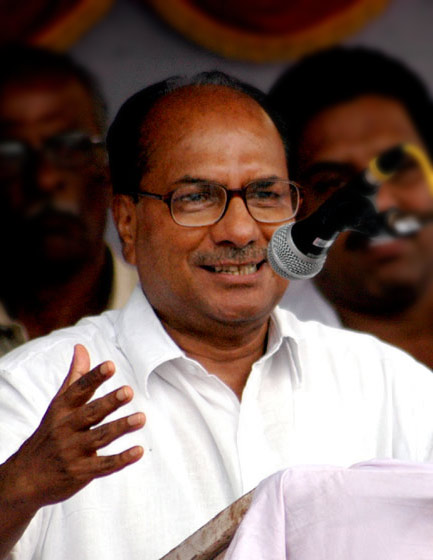
A. K. Antony

=== Union Cabinet ministers ===
- John Mathai – Minister for Finance (1948–1950)
- V. K. Krishna Menon – Minister for Defence (1957–1962)
- Panampilly Govinda Menon – Minister for Law and Railways (1969–1970)
- Ravindra Varma – Minister for Labour (1977–79)
- K. P. Unnikrishnan – Minister for Telecommunications in the V P Singh Cabinet (1989–90)
- K. Karunakaran – Minister for Industries (1995)
- A.K. Antony – Minister of Defence (2006–2014) – Minister for Consumer Affairs, Food and Public Distribution (1993–1995)
- Vayalar Ravi – Minister for Overseas Indian Affairs (2006–2014) – Minister for Civil Aviation (2011)

=== Minister of State (Independent Charges) ===
- M. P. Veerendra Kumar – Ministry of Labour with additional charge of Urban Affairs (1997–1998)
- K. V. Thomas – Ministry of Consumer Affairs, Food and Public Distribution (2009–2014)
- Alphons Kannanthanam, BJP - Union Minister of State for Electronics and Information Technology, Culture, and Tourism (2016–2019)

=== Minister of State (MoS) ===
- Lakshmi N. Menon – Ministry of External Affairs of India (1957–1966)
- M. M. Jacob – Ministries of Parliamentary Affairs, Water Resources and Home Affairs at different periods (1987–93)
- Mullappally Ramachandran – Ministry of Home Affairs (2009–2014) , Agriculture and Cooperation (1991–1996)
- O. Rajagopal, BJP – Ministry of Parliamentary Affairs, Railways, Urban Development, Defence (1999–2004)
- Shashi Tharoor – Ministry of External Affairs of India (2009–2010), Minister of State for Human Resource Development (2012–2014)
- E. Ahamed – Ministry of External Affairs, Minister of State for Human Resource Development; Minister of State for Railways (2004–2014)
- K. C. Venugopal – Ministry of Power (2011–2014)
- Kodikkunnil Suresh – Ministry of Labour and Employment (2012–2014)
- V Muraleedharan, BJP – Minister of state for External Affairs and Parliamentary Affairs (2019-2024)
- Rajeev Chandrasekhar,BJP--Minister of state for Electronics and Information Technology (2021-2024)
- George Kurian,BJP--Minister of State for Fisheries, Animal Husbandry and Dairying (2024-2026)
- Suresh Gopi,BJP--Minister of State for Petroleum and Natural Gas (2024-

== Chief Ministers ==
=== From Tamil Nadu ===
- M. G. Ramachandran, 3rd CM of Tamil Nadu
- V N Janaki Ramachandran, 4th CM of Tamil Nadu

== Ministers ==
=== Other states ===
- K. J. George – Minister, Karnataka (2013–2016),(2018-2019),(2023-

== Political leaders ==
- A. P. Udhayabhanu – Member Travancore State Assembly (1944–1952)
- C.P.Mathen – Member of Parliament (1952); Indian Ambassador to Sudan (1957–1960)
- A.K. Gopalan, Lok Sabha (1952–1977); Communist Party of India (Marxist)
- Mathai Manjooran – member of Rajya Sabha (1952–1954)
- K. M. George – member, Kerala Legislative Assembly (1960–1964) founder Kerala Congress (1964)
- K.Damodaran (Damodaran Kizhedath) – Member Rajya Sabha (1964–1970); the first 'Malayalee Communist' (1937)
- Thennala Balakrishna Pillai – Member Rajya Sabha, three terms (1991–1998; 2003–2009)
- P. Krishna Pillai – founder of communist movement in Kerala (1937)
- Azhikodan Raghavan – Communist Party Leader in Kerala
- Pannyan Raveendran – Member Loka Sabha (2006–2012); Kerala State Secretary, Communist Party of India (2012–2015)
- Pinarai Vijayan – Chief Minister, Kerala (2016-2026); Kerala State Secretary, CPI(M) (1998–2015), and member of the CPI(M) Politburo (2002–incumbent), Leader of Opposition (2026-
- Prakash Karat – General Secretary, CPI(M) of India (2005–2015)
- Panakkad Shihab Thangal (Panakkad Sayeed Mohammedali Shihab Thangal) – President of the Kerala state committee of the IUML (1975–2009)
- Ramesh Chennithala – Minister of Home (2014-2016),(2026-),Leader of Opposition(2016-2021) President, Kerala Pradesh Congress Committee (2005-2014); four times Lok Sabha MP (1989–2004)
- Anathalavattom Anandan – President, CITU State Committee; Vice Chairman, Apex Body for Coir; State Secretariat Member, CPI(M); three times MLA from Attingal Constituency
- P. Chacko MLA – Member, Kerala Legislative Assembly (1960–1964)
- Dr. George Thomas – Kerala Legislative Assembly (1967–1970)
- Vakkom Bharathan – CPI(M) leader, trade union leader
- Kummanam Rajasekharan – former Mizoram Governor; former BJP Kerala state president
- P.J. Kurien – Member and Deputy Speaker of Rajya Sabha from Kerala (2012–2018)
- V.S. Achuthanandan – former chief minister Kerala (2006–11)
- Shashi Tharoor -Member of Parliament (2009-present), famous diplomat and served as Under General Secretary at the UN
- P. K. Jayalakshmi – youngest minister in the Oommen Chandy Government (elected to office at age 30); first Adivasi Minister of Kerala
- K.Karunakaran – former chief minister Kerala (3235 days)
- Oommen Chandy – former chief minister Kerala (2446 days)
- O. Rajagopal – former Central Minister, two times MP, first BJP MLA in Kerala
- Suresh Gopi – BJP Rajyasabha MP from Kerala; National Award-winning superstar actor
- Rajeev Chandrashekar- President of BJP, Kerala , MLA(2026-
- Richard Hay – BJP Loksabha MP from Kerala, second Malayalee nominated as Anglo Indian MP
- MV Govindhan- State secretary of CPI(M),Kerala (2022-
- V Muraleedharan – Union Minister of State for External Affairs and Parliamentary Affairs, BJP Rajyasabha MP from Kerala
- Alphonse Kannanthanam – former Central Tourism, IT, Electronics Minister; BJP Rajyasabha MP from Kerala
- MA Baby- General secretary of CPI(M) (2025-
- VD Sateeshan- Chief Minister of Kerala (2026-

== Award winners ==
=== Bharat Ratna ===
The Bharat Ratna is the highest civilian award of the Republic of India.

=== Padma Vibhushan ===
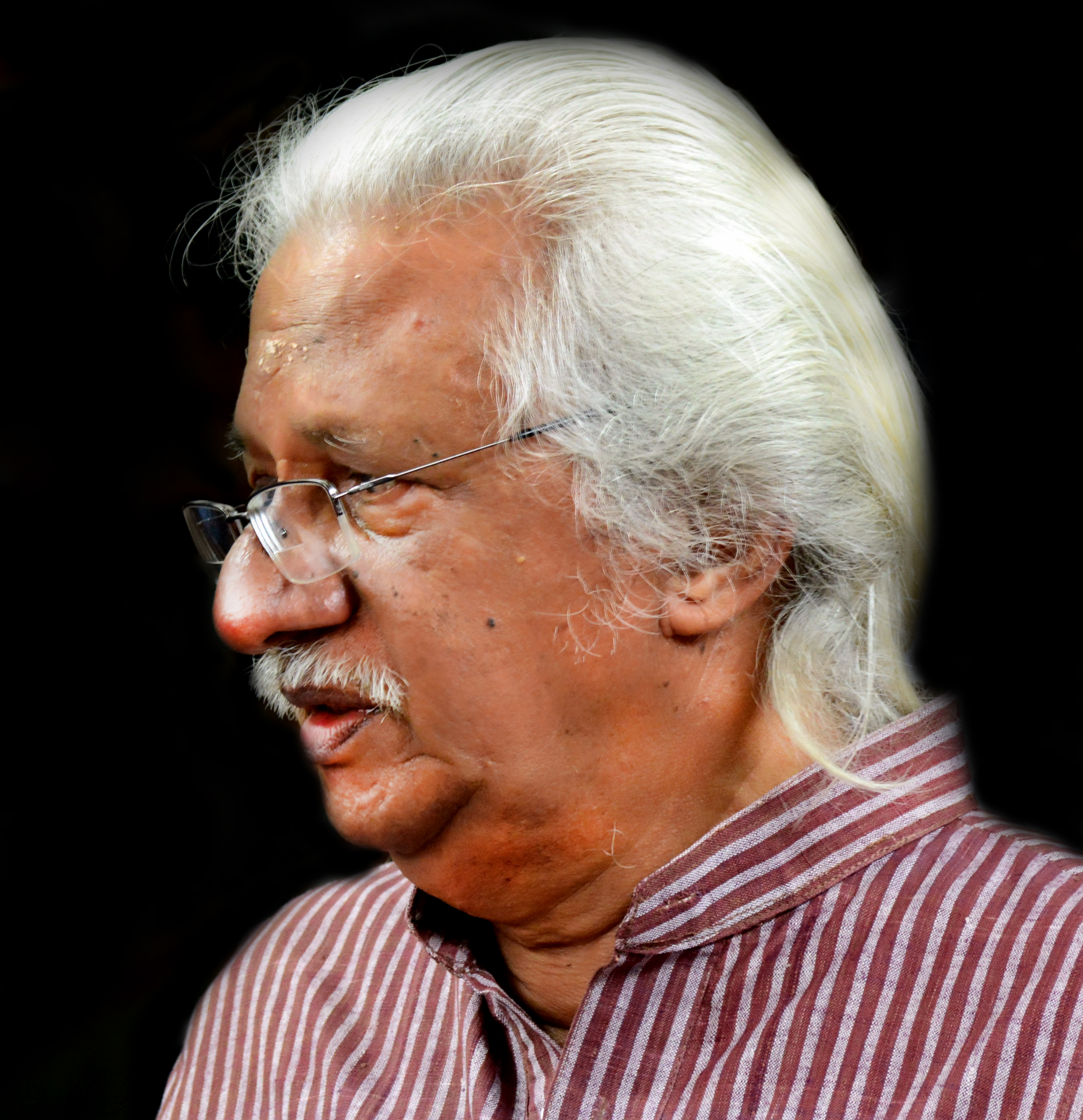
Adoor Gopalakrishnan

The Padma Vibhushan is India's second highest civilian honour.

- V.K. Krishna Menon – Public Affairs (1954)
- John Matthai – Literature & Education (1959)
- Kalpathi Ramakrishna Ramanathan (K. R. Ramanathan) – Science & Engineering (1976)
- Mambillikalathil Kumar Menon (M. G. K. Menon) – Civil Service (1985)
- V. R. Krishna Iyer – Public Affairs (1999)
- Kakkadan Nandanath Raj (K. N. Raj) – Literature & Education (2000)
- Adoor Gopalakrishnan – Arts (2006)
- George Sudarshan – Science & Engineering (2007)
- ONV Kurup – Literature & Education (2011)
- K. J. Yesudas – singing (2017)
- M.T. Vasudevan Nair – Literature (2025)

=== Padma Bhushan ===
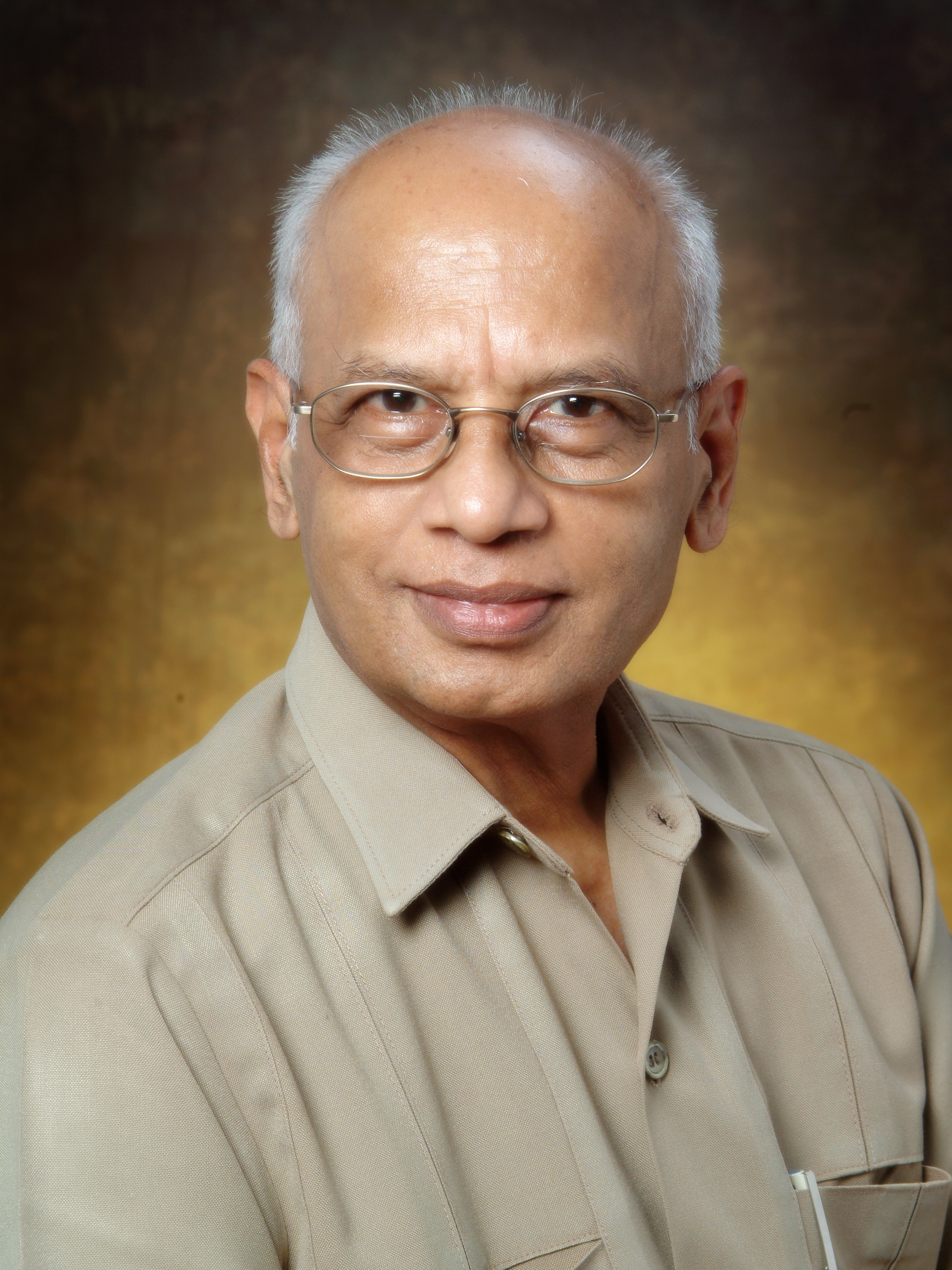
M. S. Valiathan

The Padma Bhushan is India's third highest civilian honour. (This is not a complete list.)

- Vallathol Narayana Menon – Literature & Education (1954); poet (Mahakavi)
- Lakshmi Nandan Menon (Lakshmi N. Menon) – Public Affairs (1957)
- Kumar Padma Siva Shankara Menon (K. P. S. Menon (senior)) – Civil Service (1958)
- Mannathu Padmanabhan, (Mannathu Padmanabha Pillai) – Social Work (1966)
- K.P. Kesava Menon – Public Affairs (1966)
- Govinda Shankara Kurup (G. Sankara Kurup) – Literature & Education (1968); poet
- Poyipilli Kunju Kurup, (Guru Kunchu Kurup) – Arts (1971)
- Kandathil Mammen Cherian – Literature & Education (1971)
- Pothan Joseph – Literature & Education (1973)
- George Sudarshan – Literature & Education (1976)
- Prem Nazir – Arts (1983); actor
- Thakazhi Sivasankara Pillai – Literature & Education; (1985) novelist and short story writer
- Nalapat Balamani Amma – Literature & Education (1987); poet
- Marathanda Verma Sankaran Valiathan, (M. S. Valiathan) – Medicine (1990)
- Thomas Kailath – Science and Engineering (2009)
- Thayil Jacob Sony George (T. J. S. George) – Literature & Education (2011)
- Jacob Cherian – Social Work (1999)
- Mohanlal Viswanathan Arts (2019); Art, film Acting
- S Nambi Narayan (Nambi Narayanan) – (2019); Science & Engineering-Space
- K. S. Chithra – (2021); Arts

=== Padma Shri ===
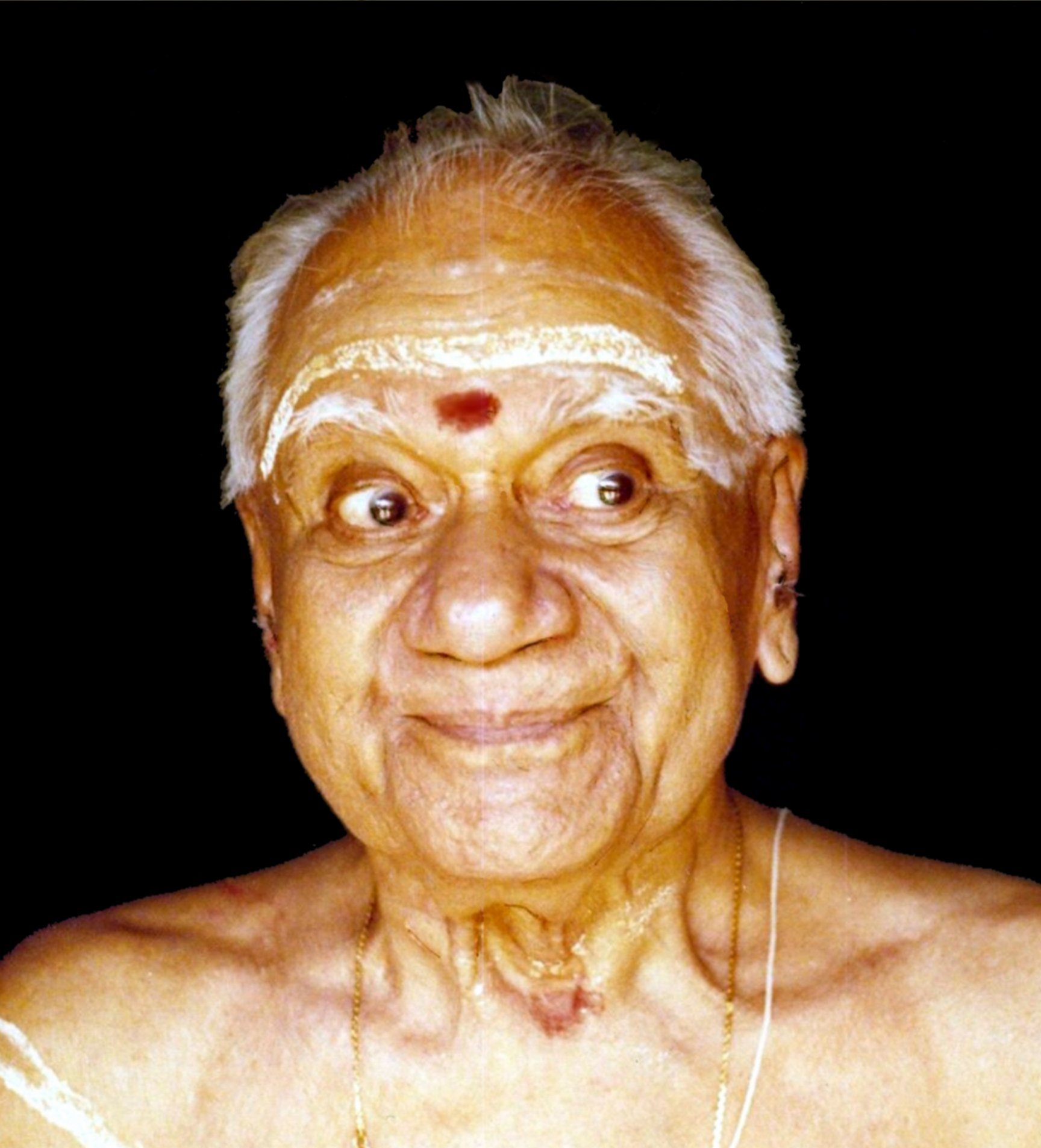
Guru Mani Madhava Chakyar (1899–1990)

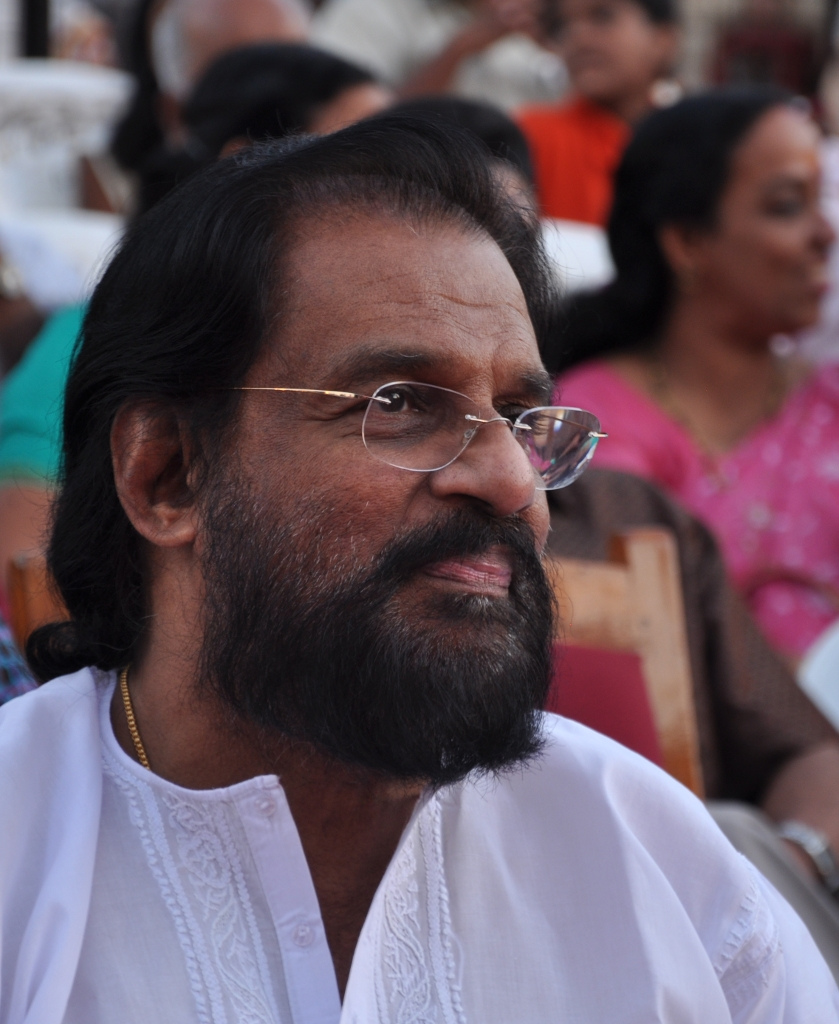
Dr. K. J. Yesudas

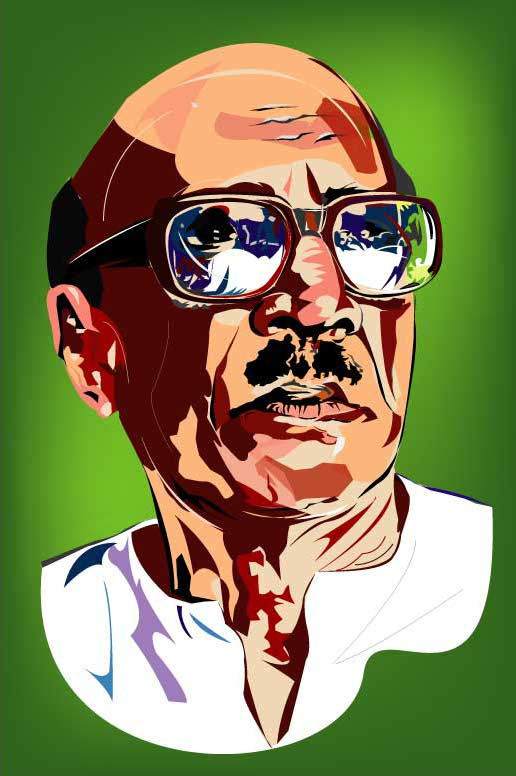
Vaikom Muhammad Basheer

The Padma Shri is India's fourth highest civilian honour. (This is not a complete list.)

- K. Shankar Pillai - Arts (1954)
- Perakath Verghese Benjamin – Medicine (1955)
- M. G. K. Menon - Science (1961)
- Guru Kunchu Kurup – Arts (1965)
- Kandathil Mammen Cherian – Literature & Education (1965)
- C.K. Nair Alias V. Kunchu Nair – Arts (1971)
- Thikkurissy Sukumaran Nair – Arts, poet and actor (1973)
- Mani Madhava Chakyar – Arts, Koodiyattam and Chakyar Koothu (1974)
- K.J. Yesudas – Arts, classical singer and musician (1975)
- Vaikom Muhammad Basheer – Literature & Education (1982)
- Manathoor Devasia Valsamma, M. D. Valsamma – Sports (1983)
- Adoor Gopalakrishnan – Arts (1984); director, screenwriter, producer
- P. T. Usha – Sports (1985)
- Bharath Gopi – Arts (1991); actor
- P. I. Mohammed Kutty (Mammootty) – Arts (1998); actor
- Viswanathan Mohanlal – Arts (2001); actor
- Rajagopalan Krishnan Vaidyan – Ayurveda (2003)
- Shobana Chandrakumar – Arts (2006); actress and Bharatanatyam dancer
- Sugathakumari – Literature & Education (2006)
- T. K. Alex – Science and Technology (2007)
- Thilakan – Arts, actor (2009)
- K. Viswanathan – Social Service (2009)
- Palpu Pushpangadan – Science and Engineering (2010)
- Resul Pokutty – Arts (2010); sound editor
- K. S. Chithra – Arts (2005); singer
- Balachandra Menon – Arts (2007); acting, direction, script writer
- Shaji N.Karun – Arts (2011); director/cinematographer
- Jose Chacko Periappuram – Medicine (2011); first heart transplant Kerala
- Gopalan Nair Shankar – Science and Engineering (2011); architecture
- Kalamandalam Sivan Namboodiri – Arts (2012); Indian classical dance – Kutiyattam
- Soman Nair Priyadarsan – Arts (2012); cinema direction
- J. Hareendran Nair – Medicine (2012); Ayurveda
- Pepita Seth – Literature and Education (2012)
- Madhu – Arts (2013)
- Padma Shri Kalamandalam Kshemavathy – Arts; dance
- K. P. Haridas – Medicine (2015); surgery
- Jayaram – Arts, cinema acting
- N. Balakrishnan Nair – Medicine (1984)
- R.K. Krishna Kumar – contributions to Indian trade and industry (2009)
- K. K. Muhammed – Others – Archaeology (2019)
- Thalappil Pradeep – Science and Technology (2020)
- O. M. Nambiar – Sports (2021)
- Kaithapram Damodaran Namboothiri (Kaithapram) – Arts (2021);

=== National Medal of Science ===
The National Medal of Science is an honor bestowed by the president of the United States to individuals in science and engineering who have made important contributions to the advancement of knowledge in the fields of behavioral and social sciences, biology, chemistry, engineering, mathematics and physics.

- Thomas Kailath (2012) – presented by President Barack Obama in 2014 for "transformative contributions to the fields of information and system science, for distinctive and sustained mentoring of young scholars, and for translation of scientific ideas into entrepreneurial ventures that have had a significant impact on industry"

=== Academy Awards ===
The Academy Awards also known as the Oscars are a set of 24 awards for artistic and technical merit in the film industry, given annually by the Academy of Motion Picture Arts and Sciences (AMPAS), to recognize excellence in cinematic achievements as assessed by the academy's voting membership.

- Resul Pookutty – Best Sound Mixing (2009) along with Ian Tapp and Richard Pryke for his work in Slumdog Millionaire

=== Booker Prize ===
The Booker Prize (formerly known as the Booker–McConnell Prize and the Booker Prize for Fiction) is a literary prize awarded each year for the best original novel written in the English language and published in the UK.

- Arundhati Roy – awarded the 1997 Booker Prize for her novel The God of Small Things

== Government and world organisations ==
=== Deputy Collector ===
Choorayi Kanaran– (1812–1876) was the first Deputy Collector of India.

=== Indian Administrative Service ===
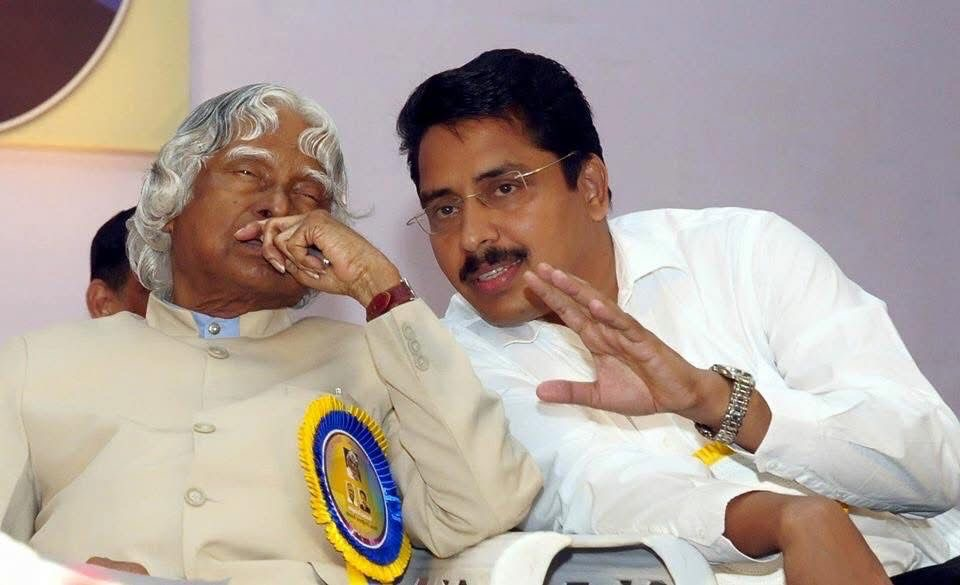
P. B. Salim with A. P. J. Abdul Kalam

- Moorkoth Ramunni –(1915-2009 the first Indian Administrative officer (IAS) from dharmadam village.
- P. B. Salim - IAS officer, Chairman & Managing Director, West Bengal Power Development Corporation Limited

=== Indian Police Service ===
- K. Koshy - Director General Police (BPRD)

=== Members of the Imperial Civil Service ===
- K P S Menon Sr. – First Foreign Secretary of India and the 1st Ambassador of India to China
- V. P. Menon – Political Reforms Commissioner to the Viceroy of India Lord Louis Mountbatten
- N. R. Pillai – First Cabinet Secretary (1950–1953)
- M. K. Vellodi – Third Cabinet Secretary (1957–1958)

=== Civil Services of India ===
==== Cabinet Secretaries ====
- Sir N R Pillai – first Cabinet Secretary of India
- T. N. Seshan – 18th Cabinet Secretary (1989–1989)
- K. M. Chandrasekhar – 29th Cabinet Secretary (2007–2011)

==== Members ====
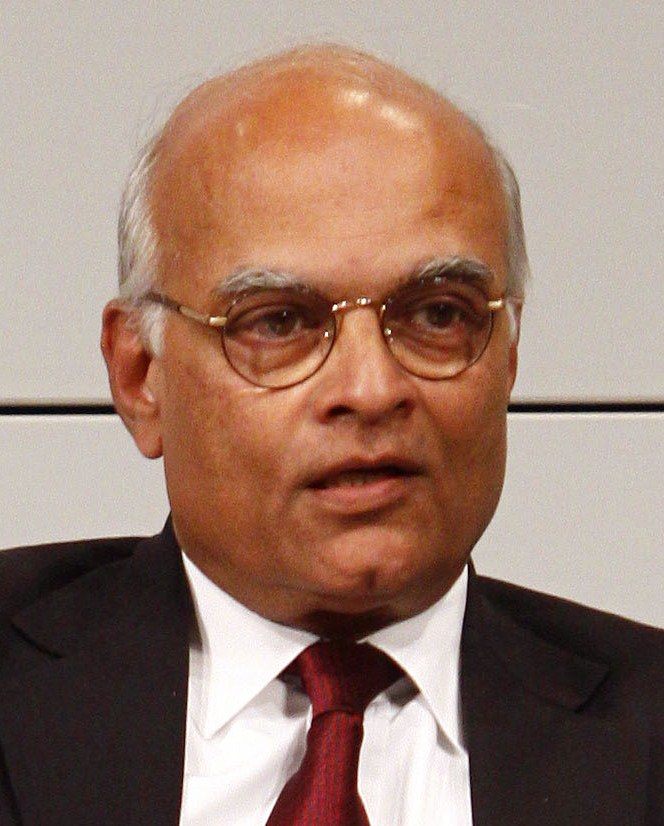
Shivshankar Menon

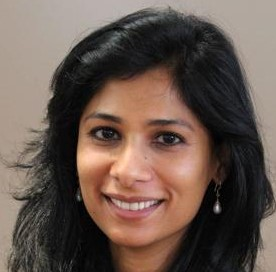
Gita Gopinath

- P.J Thomas Parakunnel – first Chief Economic Advisor of India
- T. K. A. Nair – former adviser and principal secretary to the prime minister of India
- Anna Malhotra – first female member of the Indian Administrative Service
- Shivshankar Menon – National Security Advisor to the prime minister of India
- Jyotindra Dixit – former National Security Advisor to the prime minister of India
- Nirupama Rao – Ambassador of India to United States of America
- Ranjan Mathai – 28th foreign secretary of India
- Gopal Pillai – former Home Secretary of India
- Kavalam Panikkar – former Home Secretary of India
- Hormis Tharakan – former Chief of the Research and Analysis Wing
- P. J. Thomas – 14th Central Vigilance Commissioner of India
- R. B. Sreekumar – former Director General of Police of Gujarat
- Abdul Rahman – former Director General of Police of Karnataka
- Letika Saran – former Director General of Police of Tamil Nadu
- Moorkoth Ramunni – fourth Administrator of Lakshadweep

=== Members of the United Nations ===
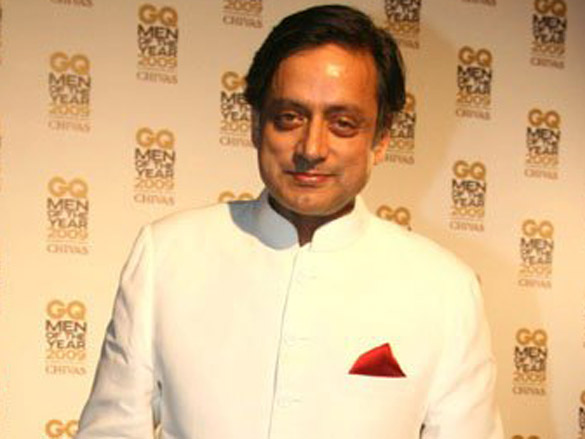
Shashi Tharoor

- Chandran Nair – Civil servant with UNESCO (1981–2004)
- Vijay K. Nambiar – Under-Secretary-General of the United Nations (2007–2012)
- Shashi Tharoor – Under-Secretary-General of the United Nations (2001–2007)
- Ajay Prabhakar – Country Programme Coordinator of the United Nations (2001–2014)

=== International Monetary Fund ===
- Gita Gopinath – First woman Chief Economist of the IMF (2019–)

== Military leaders ==
=== Early Modern Period ===
- Edachena Kunkan – Chieftain of Nair clan and military commander of Pazhassi Raja
- Thalakkal Chanthu – Chieftain of Kurichya clan and military commander of Pazhassi Raja
- Iravikkutti Pillai – Commander-in-Chief of the Venad Kingdom of present-day Kerala, India

=== Army ===
- Sushil Kumar Pillai - Indian Army General, Colonel of the Assam Regiment from 1987 to 1991 and was awarded the Param Vishisht Seva Medal in 1989.
- Neelakantan Jayachandran Nair - most decorated officer of the Indian Army, as the only serviceman to have been awarded both the highest (Ashoka Chakra) and second highest (Kirti Chakra) awards for gallantry.
- General Sundararajan Padmanabhan – 22nd General of the Indian Army and Chief of Army Staff of the Indian Army (2000–2002)
- Lieutenant General Philip Campose – Vice Chief of the Army Staff of the Indian Army
- Lieutenant General Satish Nambiar – Head of Mission of the United Nations Protection Force (1992–1993)
- Major General Jai Shanker Menon – Head of Mission and Force Commander of United Nations Disengagement Observer Force
- Lieutenant General Bobby Cherian Mathews – General officer commanding of Konark Corps
- Lieutenant General G.M. Nair – Military Secretary of India (2010-?)
- Lieutenant General K.P. Candeth – Deputy Chief of Army Staff (1965–1971?)
- Havildar Thomas Philipose – medal winner in the Indo-Pakistani War of 1971

=== Air Force ===
- Moorkoth Ramunni (15 September 1915 – 9 July 2009) was the first Malayali pilot in the Royal Indian Air Force.

Param Vishist Seva Medal holders

- Air Marshal E.P.R. Nair – Commanding-in Chief of the Training Command, Indian Air Force (1981–1985)
- Air Marshal K.N. Nair – Commanding-in Chief of the Eastern Air Command, Indian Air Force
- Air Marshal Narayan Menon – Air Officer-in-Charge (Personnel), Air Headquarters (1999–2004)

=== Navy ===
- R. Hari Kumar - 25th Chief of the Naval Staff
- Admiral Ronald Lynsdale Pereira – 9th Chief of Naval Staff of the Indian Navy (1979–1982), former Flag Officer Commanding-in-Chief of the Eastern Fleet (FOCEF), Eastern Naval Command, former Flag Officer Commanding-in-Chief of the Southern Naval Command and former Flag Officer Commanding-in-Chief of the Western Naval Command
- Vice-Admiral K. N. Sushil – former Flag Officer Commanding-in-Chief of the Southern Naval Command
- Radhika Menon – India's first female Merchant Navy captain.

== Jurists ==
=== Chief Justice ===
India

- K. G. Balakrishnan – 37th Chief Justice of India (2007–2010)

Singapore

Sundaresh Menon – 4th Chief Justice of Singapore (2012-present)

=== Judges of the Supreme Court of India ===
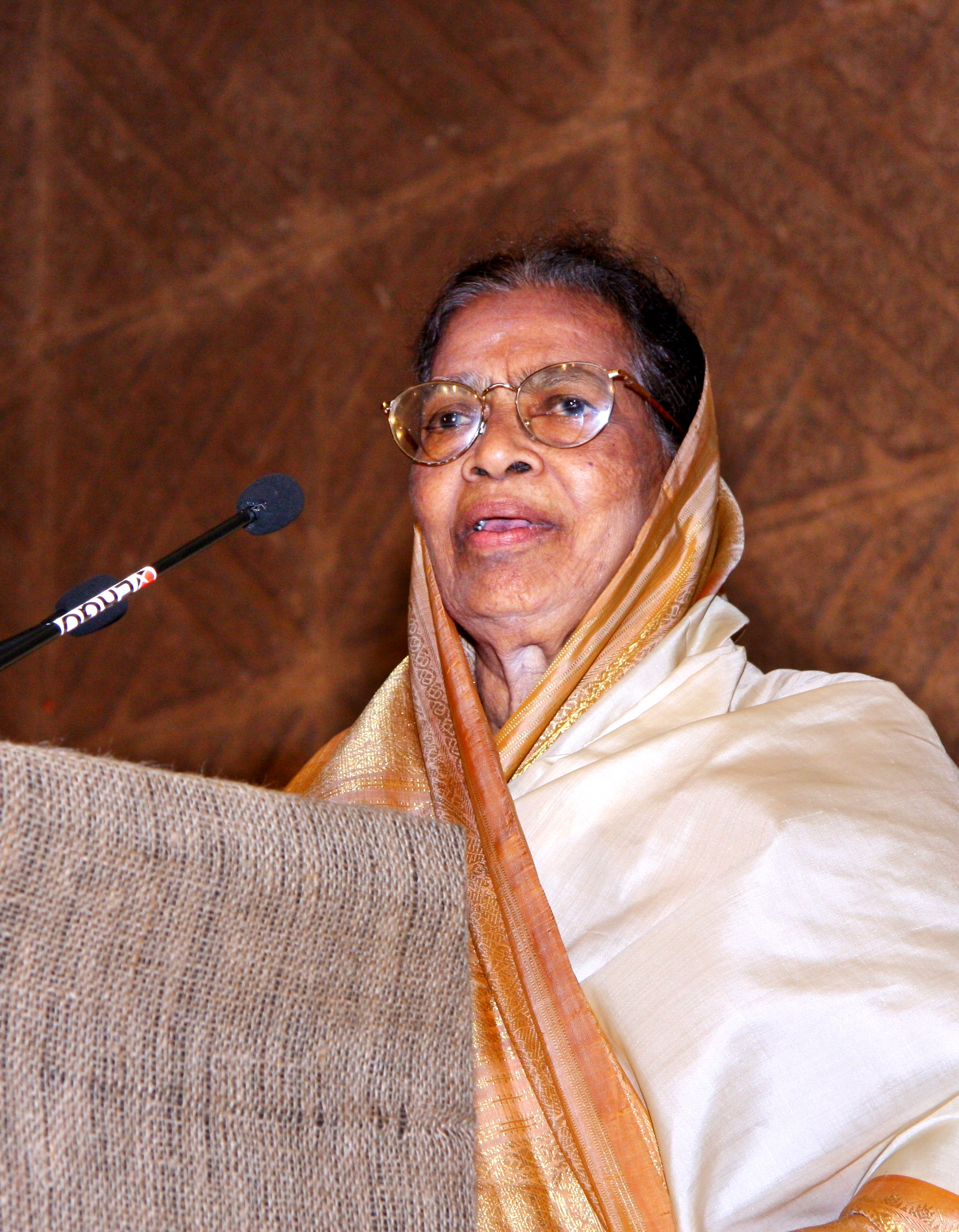
Justice M. Fathima Beevi

- K. K. Mathew (1971–1976)
- V.R. Krishna Iyer (1973–1980)
- V. Balakrishna Eradi (1981–1987)
- M. Fathima Beevi (1989–1992) – first woman Judge of the Supreme Court of India
- K. S. Paripoornan (1994–1997)
- Kurian Joseph (2013–)

=== Women Judges of the Supreme Court of India ===
- M. Fathima Beevi (1989–1992) – First woman Judge of the Supreme Court of India

=== Women Judges of the High Court ===
- Smt. Justice Anna Chandy – Judge of the High Court of Kerala (1959–1967) and the first woman in India to be a judge of a High Court
- Kumari Justice P. Janaki Amma – second woman Judge of the High Court of Kerala (1974–1982)

== Academia ==
=== Ancient mathematicians ===
- Madhava of Sangamagrama (c.1350–c.1425) – astronomer-mathematician
- Vatasseri Parameshvara Nambudiri (c. 1380–1460) – major Indian mathematician and astronomer of the Kerala school of astronomy and mathematics
- Nilakantha Somayaji (14 June 1444 – 1544), major astronomer-mathematician of Kerala school of astronomy and mathematics
- Jyeshtadeva (c. 1500–c. 1610) – astronomer-mathematician of the Kerala school of astronomy and mathematics; author of a treatise on calculus
- Achyutha Pisharadi (c. 1550 at thrikkandiyur (aka Kundapura), Tirur, Kerala, India – 7 July 1621 in Kerala) Sanskrit grammarian, astrologer, astronomer and mathematician
- Melpathur Narayana Bhattathiri (1560–1646/1666) – member of Kerala school of astronomy and mathematics and a mathematical linguist

=== Scientists ===
- K. R. Ramanathan – physicist, meteorologist and first director of Physical Research Laboratory, Ahmedabad; President of the International Union of Geodesy and Geophysics (1954–57)
- Priya Abraham – virologist, former director of National Institute of Virology.
- V. R. Lalithambika (1962–) – Indian scientist working with the Indian Space Research Organisation (ISRO); will lead the Gaganyaan mission as the director of the Indian Human Spaceflight Programme which is intended to send Indian astronauts in the space by 2022
- Krishnaswamy Kasturirangan – space scientist who headed the Indian Space Research Organisation (ISRO) 1994–2003 He is presently Chancellor of Central University of Rajasthan. He is the former chancellor of Jawaharlal Nehru University and the chairman of Karnataka Knowledge Commission. He is a former member of the Rajya Sabha (2003–09) and a former member of the now defunct Planning Commission of India. He was also the director of the National Institute of Advanced Studies, Bangalore, from April 2004 to 2009.
- Janaki Ammal (4 November 1897 – 7 February 1984) was the first women Indian botanist who obtain a PhD in botany in the U.S. and worked on plant breeding, cytogenetics and phytogeography in India. Her most notable work involved studies on sugarcane and the eggplant (brinjal).

=== Faculty ===
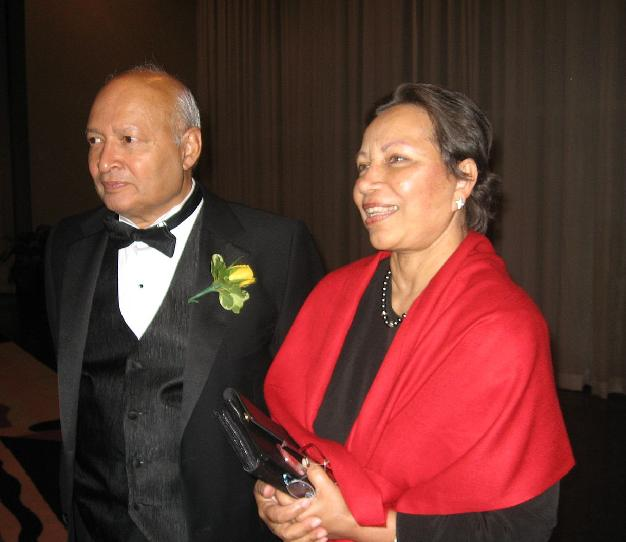
Thomas Kailath

- George Sudarsan – Padma Vibhushan Emeritus professor
- Thomas Kailath – Padma Bhushan; Professor of Engineering
- Faisal Kutty – Professor of Law
- George Varghese – Professor of Computer Science
- K. Mani Chandy – Professor of Computer Science
- Mathai Varghese – Professor of Mathematics
- Paul A. Kattuman – Professor of Economics
- Pulickel Ajayan – Professor of Engineering
- Kurien Kunnumpuram – Professor of Theology
- John Vattanky – Professor of Philosophy
- Thomas Zacharia – computer scientist
- T. Pradeep – Professor of Chemistry
- Shree K. Nayar – Professor of Computer Science

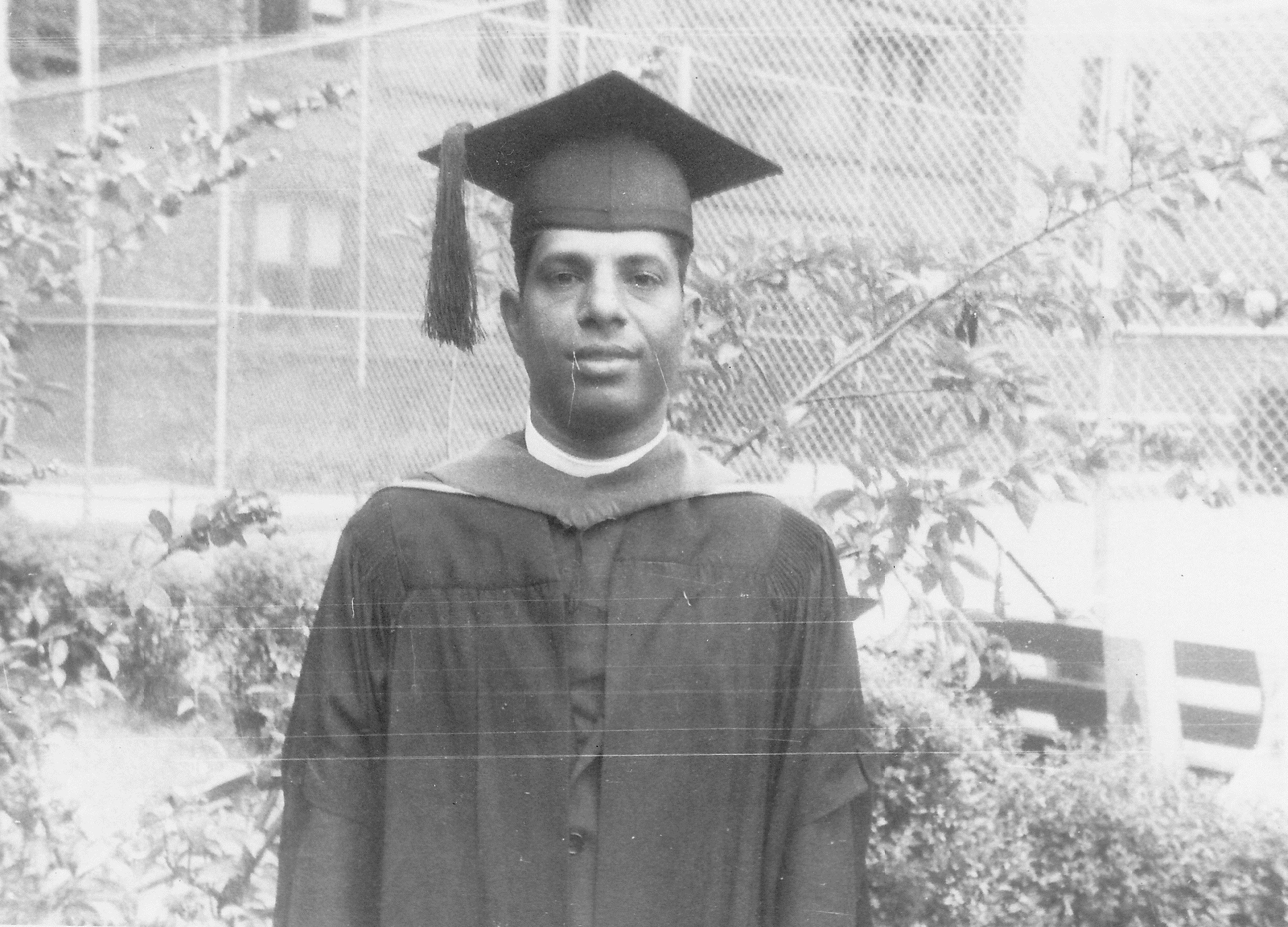
V.C. Samuel

- Rev. Fr. Dr. V.C. Samuel – Theologian, Historian, Author, Polyglot and Ecumenical Leader
- P. N. Vinayachandran – Associate Professor of Oceanography
- Thanu Padmanabhan – professor
- Kuruvilla Pandikattu – Professor of Philosophy
- G. Balakrish Nair – director
- Prahlad Vadakkepat – professor and robotics scientist
- K. R. K. Easwaran – Astra Chair Professor of the Indian Institute of Science

=== Heads of institutions ===
- John Palocaren – founding principal of St. Thomas College, Thrissur
- Mathai Varghese – director of the Institute for Geometry and its Applications (IGA), Adelaide
- Eluvathingal Devassy Jemmis – director of Indian Institute of Science Education and Research, Thiruvananthapuram
- M. G. K. Menon – former president of the Indian Statistical Institute
- V. N. Rajasekharan Pillai – 6th vice chancellor of Indira Gandhi National Open University
- Salim Gangadharan – chairman, South Indian Bank and regional director, Kerala and Lakshadweep

=== Medical sciences ===
- Dr.Ayyathan Gopalan - First male doctor and Surgeon of Kerala, First Indian superintendent and Psychiatrist of Calicut mental Asylum (Kuthiravattom mental hospital), medical school professor and social reformer of Kerala.
- Dr.Ayyathan Janaki Ammal (1881–1945) was the first female doctor in Kerala.
- Abraham Verghese – Professor of Medicine and Senior Associate Chair of Department of Internal Medicine at Stanford University School of Medicine
- Mani Menon – Director of the Vattikuti Urology Institute at the Henry Ford Hospital
- Thomas Thomas – first Indian cardio-thoracic surgeon
- M. Krishnan Nair – leading oncologist
- M. S. Valiathan – cardiac surgeon; former vice chancellor, Manipal University
- R. Kesavan Nair – Kerala's first civil surgeon
- Vaidyaratnam P. S. Warrier – Ayurvedic physician and founder of the Kottakkal Arya Vaidya Sala
- Salim Yusuf – Director of Population Health Research Institute, Canada
- Rajagopalan Krishnan Vaidyan – Ayurvedic physician
- Mohan D. Nair – Indian pharmaceutical scientist and author

=== Humanities and social sciences ===
- Nivedita Menon – feminist writer; professor of political thought at Jawaharlal Nehru University

== Business and commerce ==
- Rajeev Madhavan – entrepreneur
- Rajesh Gopinathan – CEO of Tata Consultancy Services
- Thomas Kurian – Global President of Product Development at Oracle Corporation
- Reji Abraham – Managing Director of ABAN Group of Companies
- C J George – founder and CEO of Geojit Financial Services
- Kris Gopalakrishnan – Co-chairman and former CEO of Infosys Technologies
- S. D. Shibulal – CEO and managing director of Infosys Technologies
- RK Krishna Kumar – trustee of Sir Dorabji Tata Trust and Sir Ratan Tata Trust
- R Gopalakrishnan – Executive Director of Tata Sons
- B. Ravi Pillai – Indian business magnate
- George Alexander Muthoot – Managing Director of Muthoot Finance & Muthoot Group
- Verghese Kurien – founder Chairman of Gujarat Co-operative Milk Marketing Federation Ltd.
- Thakiyudeen Wahid – owner of East West Airlines
- K.M. Mammen Mappilai – founder of MRF Tyres and Manorama publications
- C. P. Krishnan Nair – founder of the Leela Group of Hotels
- Rajmohan Pillai – Chairman of Beta Group
- Kochouseph Chittilappilly – Managing Director of V Guard Industries Ltd
- M. A. Yousuf Ali – founder of EMKE Group, Lulu Hypermarkets and Supermarkets in United Arab Emirates
- Beena Kannan – Managing Director and Lead Designer of Seematti
- Nadakkal Parameswaran Pillai or "Coffee House Pillai" – co-founder of Indian Coffee Houses in Kerala
- Byju Raveendran – founder of Think and Learn Private Ltd, popularly known as BYJU'S - The Learning App, the first investment in Asia from the Chan Zuckerberg Initiative It is considered to be one among the only few Indian consumer startups that has gone global, particularly with the 2017 acquisition of TutorVista.
- Ajit Balakrishnan – founder and Chairman of Rediff
- Dileep K Nair – first Chancellor of North East Frontier Technical University; publisher of The Engineers Outlook Magazine
- PNC Menon – founder of Sobha Developers Limited
- Arun M. Kumar – chairman and chief executive officer at KPMG India
- Mathunny Mathews – former MD of Al-Sayer Group; former chairman of Jabriya Indian School; co-founder of Indian Arts Circle, Kuwait

=== Independence activists ===
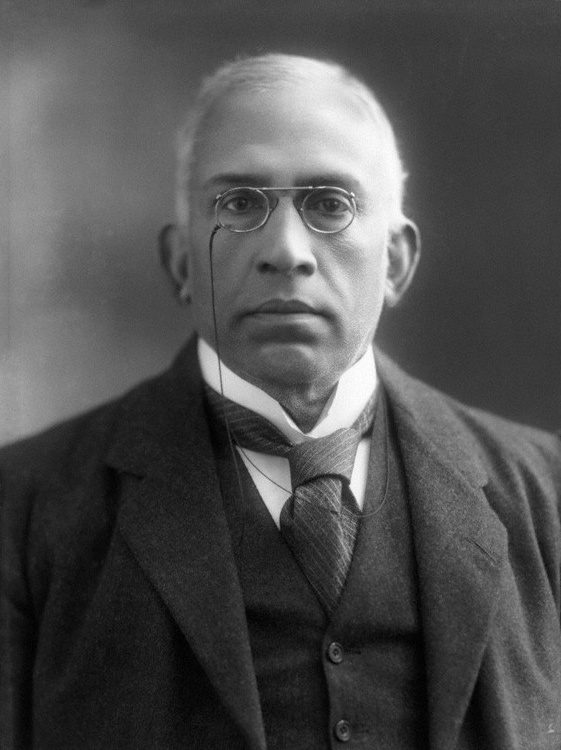
Sir Chettur Sankaran Nair

- Sir Chettur Sankaran Nair – KCIE, President of the Indian National Congress (1897–1898)
- Lakshmi Sehgal – as Captain Lakshmi, she commanded the Jhansi Rani Regiment of the INA under Netaji Subhash Chandra Bose
- Kumbalathu Sanku Pillai - the president of Kerala Pradesh Congress Committee from 1949-1951
- N.P. Nayar – administrator of Azad Hind Dal
- K. Kelappan - freedom fighter
- K. P. Kesava Menon – founder-editor of the Mathrubhumi newspaper
- A. K. Gopalan Nambiar – founder leader of the Communist Party of India
- K. Kumar (Kumarji) – Gandhian nationalist, orator and reformer who revived the banned Swadeshabhimani newspaper
- Veliyankode Umar Khasi – mystic leader and Muslim scholar, freedom fighter and poet
- Ammu Swaminathan
- Accamma Cherian – Jhansi Rani of Travancore
- Mohammed Abdul Rahiman – freedom fighter and former KPCC President
- Vakkom Majeed – former member of Travancore-Cochin State Assembly
- T. M. Varghese – Minister of Travancore-Cochin
- George Joseph – lawyer, trade unionist and nationalist activist
- C. Kesavan – Chief Minister of Travancore-Cochin
- K. Kelappan – leader of the Payyanur Salt Satyagraha and the Guruvayur Satyagraha
- Vaikom Muhammad Basheer – Malayalam fiction writer, humanist, freedom fighter, novelist and short story writer
- Velu Thampi Dalava
- Ammu Swaminathan
- A. J. John, Anaparambil
- Nettur. P. Damodaran – social worker
- Moidu Moulavi – leader of the Indian National Congress

=== Social reformers ===
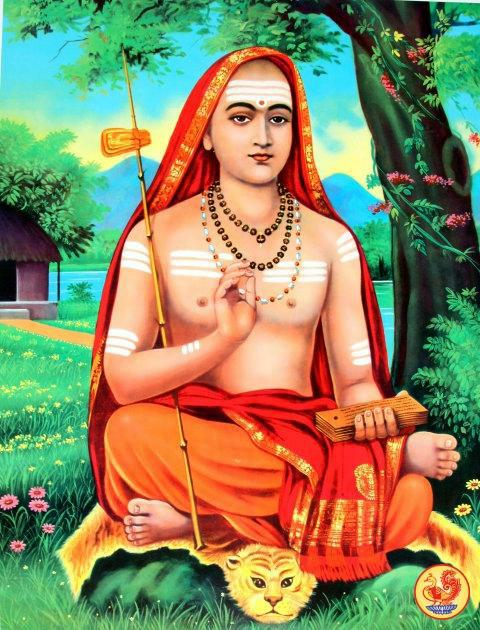
Ādi Śaṅkarācārya

- Adi Sankara (788–820) – saint, poet, philosopher and reviver of Hinduism in India
- Ayyankali – leader of Dalits
- Ayyathan Gopalan (1861-1948) - Social reformer, Founder of Sugunavardhini movement, Depressed Classes Mission, Leader and Propagandist of Brahmo Samaj in Kerala.
- Kallingal Madathil Rarichan Moopan - (1856–1919) Kozhikode social reformer and Sreekandeswara Temple construction activity.
- K. M. Seethi – Saheb Bahadur, usually referred to as Seethi Saheb
- Chattampi Swamikal (1853–1925) – social reformer
- C. Kesavan – Chief Minister of erstwhile state of Travancore-Cochin, 1951–1952
- Kuriakose Elias Chavara – social reformer and Syrian Catholic saint
- Lalithambika Antharjanam – social reformer and writer
- K. P. Kesava Menon – founder of Mathrubhumi daily
- K. Kumar (Elanthoor Kumarji) – freedom fighter and social-reformer who worked for Harijan upliftment and communal harmony
- K. Kelappan – freedom fighter and social reformer
- Mathai Manjooran (1912–1970) – socialist revolutionary, member of the Indian Parliament, Labor Minister in the 2nd EMS communist ministry
- Mannathu Padmanabhan – founder of Nair Service Society
- M. C. Joseph – rationalist, founding editor of Yukthivadi
- Nawab Rajendran – social activist
- Sree Narayana Guru (1856–1928) – pivotal figure in the Renaissance of Kerala, social reformer, scholar, teacher, saint and Vedantin
- Sahodaran Ayyappan – social reformer, follower of Sri Narayana Guru
- Nataraja Guru – disciple of Narayana Guru
- Vakkom Moulavi (1877–1933) – social reformer, educationist, writer and journalist
- Abraham Barak Salem – Zionist, Indian nationalist, leader of the Jewish community and social activist

== Religion and spirituality ==
=== Hinduism ===
- Adi Sankara (788–820) – saint, poet, philosopher and reviver of Hinduism in India
- Chattampi Swamikal (1853–1924) – Hindu sage and social reformer
- Vagbhatananda (1885 – October 1939) was a Hindu religious leader and Social reformer in British India.
- Sree Narayana Guru (1854–1928) – founder of Sivagiri Mutt and social reformer of India
- Tapovan Maharaj (1889–1957) – teacher of Swami Chinmayananda and Swami Sundaranand
- Swami Ranganathananda (1908–2005) – 13th president of the Ramakrishna Math and Mission
- Eknath Easwaran (1910–1999) – spiritual teacher, developed passage meditation used across traditions
- Chinmayananda (1916–1993) – founder of Chinmaya Mission
- Nitya Chaitanya Yati (1924–1999) – exponent of Advaita Vedanta
- Karunakara Guru (1927–1999) – spiritual leader, founder of Santhigiri Ashram
- Swami Bhoomananda Tirtha (1933–) – spiritual leader and the founder of Narayanashrama Tapovanam
- Swami Abhedananda Abhedashramam Thriruvanthapuram
- Mata Amritanandamayi (1953–) – spiritual leader and founder of Mata Amritanandamayi Math popularly known as Amma

=== Islam ===
- Panakkad Thangal
- Ahmad Kutty – Islamic scholar
- Kanthapuram A. P. Aboobacker Musliyar – Grand Mufti of India
- Cherussery Musliyar
- KT Manu Musliar
- Kalambadi Muhammad Musliyar
- Ullal Thangal
- Hyderali Shihab Thangal
- Chekannur Maulavi – progressive Islamic cleric
- MM Akbar – Muslim intellectual, comparative religion scholar
- Abdul Hakeem Azhari - Islamic scholar
- Kanniyath Ahmed Musliyar - Islamic Scholar
- E. K. Aboobacker Musliyar - Community Leader
- Hussain Madavoor - Islamic Scholar
- Ibraheem Khaleel Al Bukhari - Islamic Scholar

=== Christianity ===
- Philipose Mar Chrysostom – Grand Metropolitan of Malankara Marthoma Syrian Church and Marthoma XX
- Mar Yohannan Yoseph – Episcopal Bishop of the Holy Assyrian Church of the East
- Alphonsa of the Immaculate Conception – first woman of Indian origin to be canonised as a saint by the Catholic Church
- Baselios Cleemis – Cardinal-Priest of the Church of Saint Gregory VII
- Baselios Mar Thoma Paulose II – Catholicos of the Malankara Orthodox Syrian Church
- Baselios Thomas I – Catholicos of the Jacobite Syrian Christian Church
- Geevarghese Mar Gregorios (Parumala Thirumeni) – First Indian canonized saint by the Malankara Orthodox Syrian Church
- George Alencherry – Cardinal-Priest of San Bernardo alle Terme
- Joseph Mar Thoma – primate of the Mar Thoma Syrian Church
- Joy Alappatt – Syro-Malabar Catholic bishop in the United States
- Joseph Parecattil – inducted as Cardinal by Pope John Paul II in June 1988
- KP Yohannan – Metropolitan Bishop of Believers Church
- Kuriakose Elias Chavara – Syro-Malabar Catholic Church saint and social reformer
- K.V. Simon – Kerala Brethren pioneer
- Mar Gregory Karotemprel – Bishop of the Syro-Malabar Catholic Eparchy of Rajkot
- P.C. John – Kerala Brethren pioneer
- Saint Euphrasia – Indian Carmelite nun of the Syro-Malabar Church
- Varkey Vithayathil – former Cardinal-Priest of San Bernardo alle Terme
- Varghese Payyappilly Palakkappilly – elevated as Venerable by the Syro-Malabar Catholic Church
- Palackal Thoma – Indian Catholic priest of the Syro-Malabar Church based in India
- Theodosius Mar Thoma-[Marthoma Church]- primate of the Mar Thoma Syrian Church

=== PRDS ===
- Poykayil Yohannan aka Poykayil Kumara Guru Devan – activist, poet and the founder of the socio-religious movement Prathyaksha Raksha Daiva Sabha

== Literature and writing ==
=== Writers ===
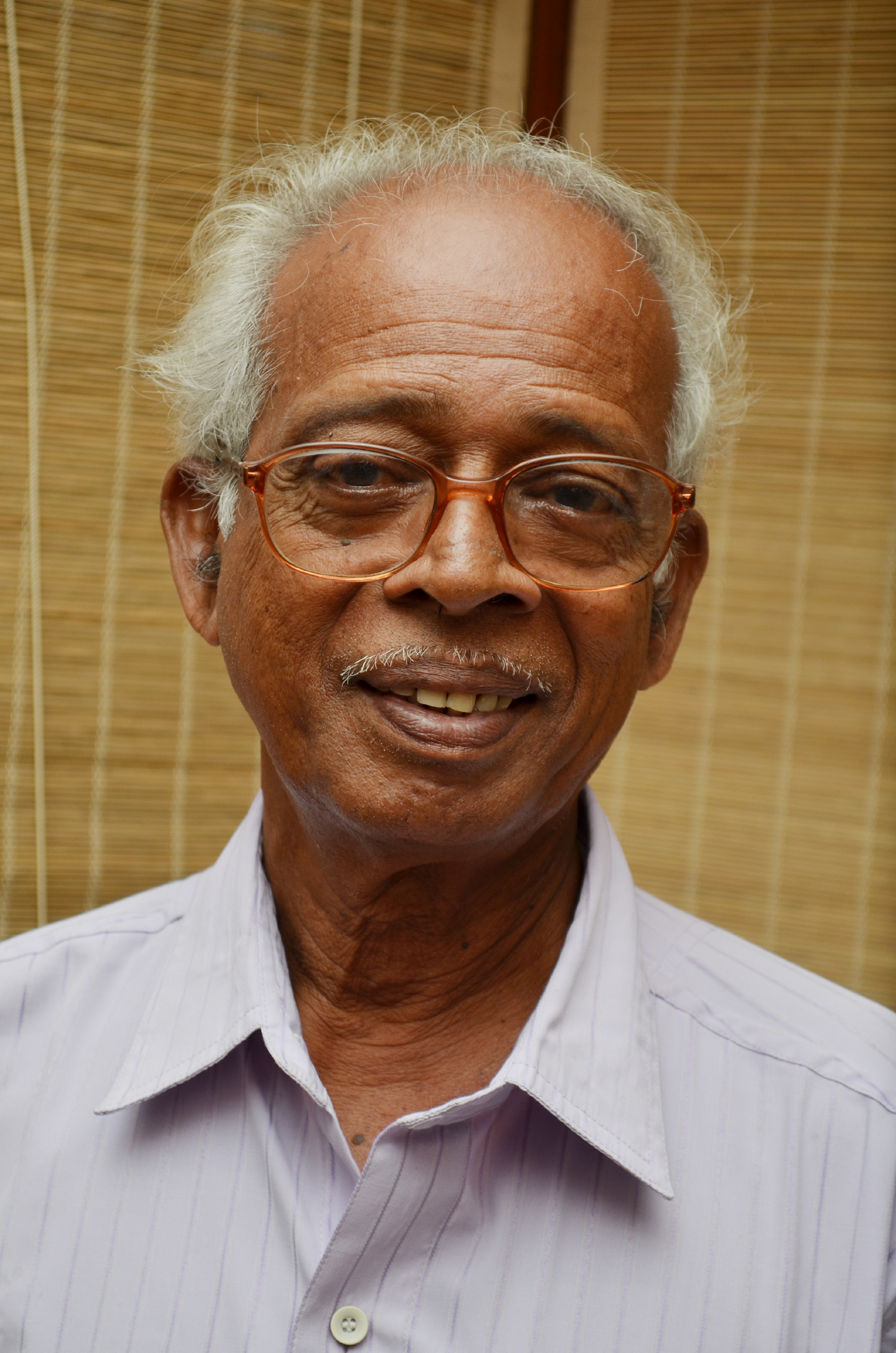
Chandiroor Divakaran

- Ajay Prabhakar – international author and researcher
- A. R. Raja Raja Varma – linguist and grammarian
- Akkitham Achuthan Namboothiri – Malayalam poet; winner of the Kendra Sahithya Academy Award for Malayalam in 1973
- Appu Nedungadi – author of Kundalatha, the first Malayalam novel
- Anita Nair – writer
- Arundhati Roy – actress turned writer, awarded the Booker Prize in 1997 for The God of Small Things, which is set in Kerala
- Balachandran Chullikkadu – poet
- Balamani Amma – poet; won the literary medal in India, the Saraswathi Samman
- Chandiroor Divakaran – poet, folk songwriter and 2011 Ambedkar Award winner
- Changampuzha Krishna Pillai (1911–1948) – poet, author of the pastoral elegy "Ramanan" (1936)
- Cherusseri Namboothiri – poet, author of Krishnagaadha (The Song of Krishna)
- D. Vinayachandran – poet
- Edasseri Govindan Nair – poet and playwright
- Faisal Kutty – lawyer, professor and columnist
- G. Sankara Kurup – poet
- George Menachery – historian, editor of The St. Thomas Christian Encyclopaedia of India, editor of The Indian Church History Classics (The Nazranies)
- Gopi Kottoor – internationally renowned poet
- Hassan Thikkodi – writer, poet, Chairman of MES Raja Residential School
- Hameed Chennamangaloor – writer, progressive Muslim intellectual, critic of religious fundamentalism
- E. Harikumar – novelist and short story writer
- Ilango Adigal – author of Silappatikaram, one of the Five Great Epics of Tamil literature; identifies himself as a Chera prince from the 2nd century CE
- Kadammanitta Ramakrishnan – Malayalam poet
- Kalakkaththu Kunchan Nambiar – poet
- Kamala Das – English poet and novelist; also wrote in Malayalam under the pen-name Madhavikkutty; first Indian woman to openly write about women's sexuality; embraced Islam under the name Kamala Suraiyya in 1999; Asian Poetry Prize, 1964; Kent Award, 1965
- Kesari Balakrishna Pillai – social thinker, literary critic
- Kottarathil Sankunni – well known author of Malayalam literature. He made significant contributions in both poetry and prose. He started compiling the legends of Kerala in 1909 and completed the work in eight volumes over a quarter of a century. "Aithihyamala" (Garland of Legends) is a collection of stories of legends prepared by Kottarathil Sankunni. The works on the legends were collected and published by Sankunni in the famous Malayalam literary magazine of the nineteenth century, the Bhashaposhini.
- Kumaran Asan – poet, also called Mahakavi Kumaran Asan, died at age 51 in a boat (named Redeemer) accident en route Alapuzha to Kollam in January 1924
- Kunjunni – Malayalam poet
- N. S. Madhavan – writer and civil servant
- Manu S Pillai – author of “The Ivory Throne”
- M. Krishnan Nair – literary critic
- M. Mukundan – novelist
- Moothiringode Bhavathrāthan Namboothiripad – author and social
- Moyinkutty Vaidyar – poet
- M. P. Parameswaran – scientist turned social activist
- M. P. Paul – literary critic
- M. T. Vasudevan Nair – writer and cinema personality; Jnanpith Award, 1995
- Nalankal Krishna Pillai - writer and educationist
- Nanditha K. S. – poet
- Niranam Poets – three Malayali poets, Madhava Panikkar, Sankara Panikkar and Rama Panikkar of the Kannassa family; they lived between AD 1350 and 1450 in the Niranam village of Tiruvalla
- Nitya Chaitanya Yati – scholar and monk
- O. Chandumenon – novelist
- O. V. Vijayan – novelist and cartoonist
- O. N. V. Kurup
- P. C. Devassia (1906–2006) – Sanskrit scholar and poet who won the Sahitya Akademi Award (1980) for Sanskrit for his poem "Kristubhagavatam"
- P. Parameswaran – director of Bharatiya Vichara Kendram; former president of Vivekanand Kendra, Kanyakumari; also known as Parameswarji
- P. F. Mathews – novelist, short story writer and screenwriter
- P. K. Gopi – poet
- P. M. Taj – writer
- Paul Zacharia – writer
- Poonthanam – poet belonging to the Bhakti school
- Sarah Joseph – writer, Novelist, Sahitya Academy winner
- Shashi Tharoor – novelist, Commonwealth Writers Prize, 1991; previous Under-Secretary-General (Communication and Public Information) of the United Nations, Deputy Minister of External affairs
- S. K. Pottekkatt – author winner of the Jnanpith award of 1980
- Shreekumar Varma – novelist, award-winning playwright, poet, children's author
- Sugathakumari – Indian poet and activist
- Sukumar Azhikode – teacher, critic and orator
- Thakazhi Sivasankara Pillai – novelist and short story writer; Jnanpith Award in 1984
- Thirunalloor Karunakaran – poet, scholar, teacher and leftist intellectual
- Thunchaththu Ramanujan Ezhuthachan – architect of modern Malayalam; poet
- Ulloor S Parameswara Iyer – poet
- Uroob – writer, novelist, Sahitya Academy winner, winner of president of India's silver medal
- Vaikom Muhammad Basheer – writer, philosopher
- Vakkom Abdul Khader Moulavi – publisher, social reformer, and a leader of the progressive Islahi Movement in Kerala
- Vallathol Narayana Menon – Mahaakavi; founder of Kerala Kalamandalam,
- Vayalar Ramavarma – lyricist
- Vayalar Sarath Chandra varma – Malayalam film
- Vijayan, M. N – writer, literary critic, social activist
- Vrindavanam Venugopalan – writer, journalist and educationalist
- Vyloppilli Sreedhara Menon – Malayalam poet
- V. Madhusoodanan Nair – Malayalam poet and winner of the Kendra Sahitya Akademi Award for Malayalam in 2019
- Yusuf Ali Kechery – poet, lyricist

== Journalists ==
- O. Abdurahman – Editor-in-charge of Madhyamam
- Sunnykutty Abraham – COO and Chief News Editor of Jaihind TV; political analyst
- BRP Bhaskar - senior journalist and human rights-social activist
- T. N. Gopakumar – Editor-in-Chief, Asianet News
- K. Kumar of Travancore – Gandhian reformer, nationalist and Freedom Fighter who revived and edited "Swadeshabhimani" run by the deported Swadeshabhimani Ramakrishnana Pillai
- Faisal Kutty – lawyer and columnist for Express Tribune, Toronto Star, Middle East Eye and Madhyamam Daily
- V. K. Madhavan Kutty – Former Editor of the Malayalam daily Mathrubhumi, and a founder director of satellite channel Asianet
- K. C. Mammen Mappillai – founder of Malayala Manorama
- Sebastian Paul – Media critic
- Nisha Pillai – BBC newsreader
- Swadeshabhimani Ramakrishna Pillai the deported nationalist who edited the Swadeshabhimani newspaper

== Film and media ==
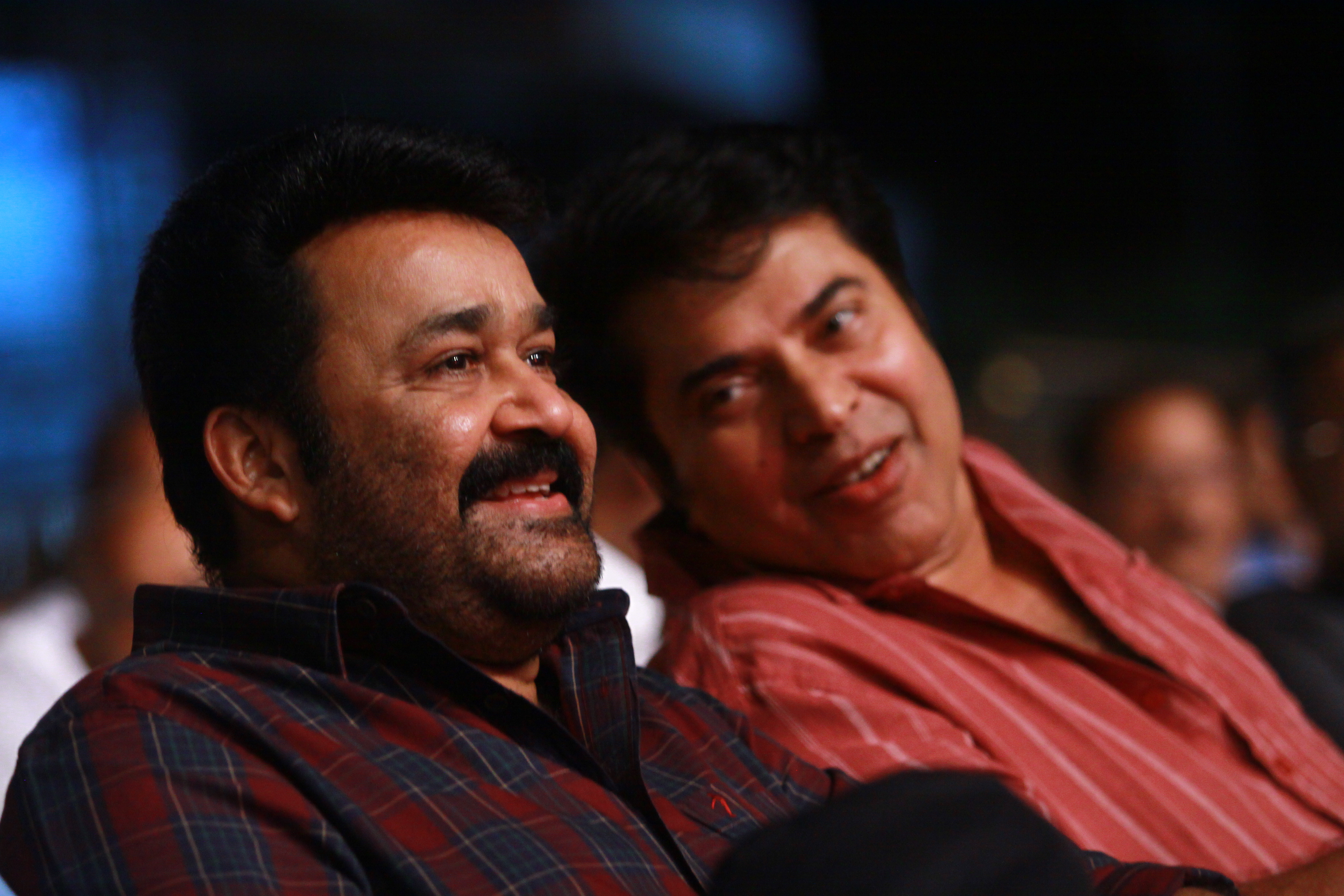
Mohanlal and Mammootty

=== Models ===
- Divya Pillai
- Lakshmi Menon
- Nafisa Joseph
- Neeta Pillai
- Nina Manuel
- Parvathy Omanakuttan
- Rhea Pillai
- Sana Khan
- Sheetal Menon
- Surelee Joseph
- Thulasi Nair

=== Actresses ===
- Ambika
- Ambika Sukumaran
- Anaswara Rajan
- Ann Augustine
- Ann Sheetal
- Anna Ben
- Anju Kurian
- Anna Reshma
- Annie
- Anumol
- Annu Antony
- Asin
- Aishwarya Lekshmi
- Bhama Kurup
- Bhavana
- Catherine Tresa
- Deepthi Sathi
- Gayatri
- Geetu Mohandas – Kerala State Film Award for Best Actress 2004
- Ivana
- Jayabharathi Pillai
- K. P. A. C. Lalitha – National Film Award for Best Supporting Actress (1990)
- Karthika Nair
- Kalpana
- Kaviyoor Ponnamma
- Kavya Madhavan
- Keerthy Suresh
- Lakshmi Menon
- Lalitha
- Liza Koshy
- Mohamallika Pillai (Mallika Sukumaran)
- Manju Warrier – Special Jury Award (National)
- Mamitha Baiju
- Meera Jasmine – National Film Award for Best Actress (2004)
- Megha Akash
- Monisha Unni – National Film Award for Best Actress (1986)
- Nalini
- Namitha Pramod
- Navya Nair
- Nayantara man
- Nazriya Nazim
- Neha Dhupia
- Nithya Menen
- Nivetha Thomas
- Nimisha sajayan
- Nikhila
- Padmini
- Parvathy Jayaram
- Ragini
- Radha
- Remya Nambeesan
- Revathi Menon
- Rejisha
- Rima Kallingal
- Samvrutha Sunil
- Samantha
- Samyuktha varma
- Samyuktha menon
- Shobana Chandrakumar Pillai – Padma Shri recipient, National Film Award for Best Actress (1993, 2001)
- Shweta Menon
- Siddhi Mahajankatti
- Sindhu Menon
- Suchitra Pillai
- Sukumari – Padma Shri recipient
- Trisha Krishnan
- Urvashi – National Film Award for Best Supporting Actress (2005)
- Uma Shankari
- Unni Mary
- Vidya Balan

=== Actors ===
- Balachandra Menon – Padma Shri recipient; National Award winner for acting and direction; holder of a world record
- Bharath Gopi – actor, Padma Shri recipient and winner of the national award for Best Actor in 1977
- Shankar (actor) – Romantic Hero of Malayalam in the eighties.
- Dulquer Salmaan
- Dhruv Vikram
- Fahadh Faasil
- Jagathy Sreekumar
- Jayan
- Jayaram – Padma Shri recipient
- Jayasurya – actor, winner of the national for Special Jury Mention in 2016
- John Abraham – Bollywood actor
- Kalabhavan Mani – actor; National Award for special jury
- M.N. Nambiar
- Madhu – actor, winner of Padma Shri
- Mammootty – Padma Shri recipient; three-time National Award winner
- Mohanlal – Padma Bhushan ,Padma Shri recipient; two-time National Film Award winner
- Murali – actor and winner of the national award for Best Actor in 2002
- Naveen Andrews – Hollywood actor
- Nedumudi Venu
- Nivin Pauly
- Prem Nazir – Padma Bhushan recipient; holds four Guinness records
- Premji – stage and film actor
- Prithviraj Sukumaran – actor; Kerala
- State Award winner 2006
- Reghuvaran
- Roshan Mathew
- Salim Kumar – actor, winner of the national award for Best Actor in 2010
- Sathyan
- Shishir Kurup – Hollywood actor
- Suraj Sharma – Hollywood and Bollywood actor
- Suraj Venjaramoodu – actor and winner of the National award for Best Actor in 2013
- Suresh Gopi – actor and winner of the national award for Best Actor in 1998
- Suresh Menon – Bollywood comedian and actor
- Thikkurussi Sukumaran Nair – Padma Shri recipient; actor; winner of the national award for Best Supporting Actor in 1959
- Tovino Thomas

=== Film producer and directors ===
- Alberrt Antoni – film director
- Appachan – film director and producer
- Bejoy Nambiar – film director
- Benny Mathews – Hollywood director
- Bharath Gopi – film, drama producer, director and actor
- Bharathan – filmmaker
- Blessy – filmmaker
- Fazil – film director and writer
- G. Aravindan – film director and cartoonist
- G. Devarajan – music director
- Gowtham Menon – Tamil film director
- I.V. Sasi – film director
- Jayaraj – director
- John Matthew Matthan – Hindi film director
- Joshiy – film director
- K P Kumaran – filmmaker
- Kunchacko – film producer
- Lohithadas – film director and writer
- Madhu Muttam – script writer
- Mira Nair – Hollywood film director, BAFTA Award recipient
- M. T. Vasudevan Nair – writer and cinema personality; Jnanpith Award, 1995
- P.F. Mathews – script writer, recipient of National Award
- P.T.Kunju Muhammed – film director and writer
- P. Padmarajan (1945–1991) – film director
- Priyadarshan – film director
- Rajeev Ravi – cinematographer, director, producer, National Film Award for Best Cinematography
- Ranjith – film director and writer
- Resul Pookutty – sound engineer, first Oscar-winning Indian (for film Slumdog Millionaire)
- Rosshan Andrrews – director
- Rupesh Paul – Hollywood director
- Sabu Cyril – art director
- Sangeeth Sivan – director
- Santosh Sivan – director and cinematographer
- Sathyan Anthikkad – Malayalam film director
- Shaji Kylas – action film director
- Shajith Koyeri – National Film Awards-winning sound designer
- Shaji N. Karun – film director
- Sibi Malayil – Malayalam film director
- Siddique – filmmaker
- Sohanlal – director and writer
- Sreenivasan – writer, director and actor
- TK Rajeev Kumar – filmmaker

=== Music ===
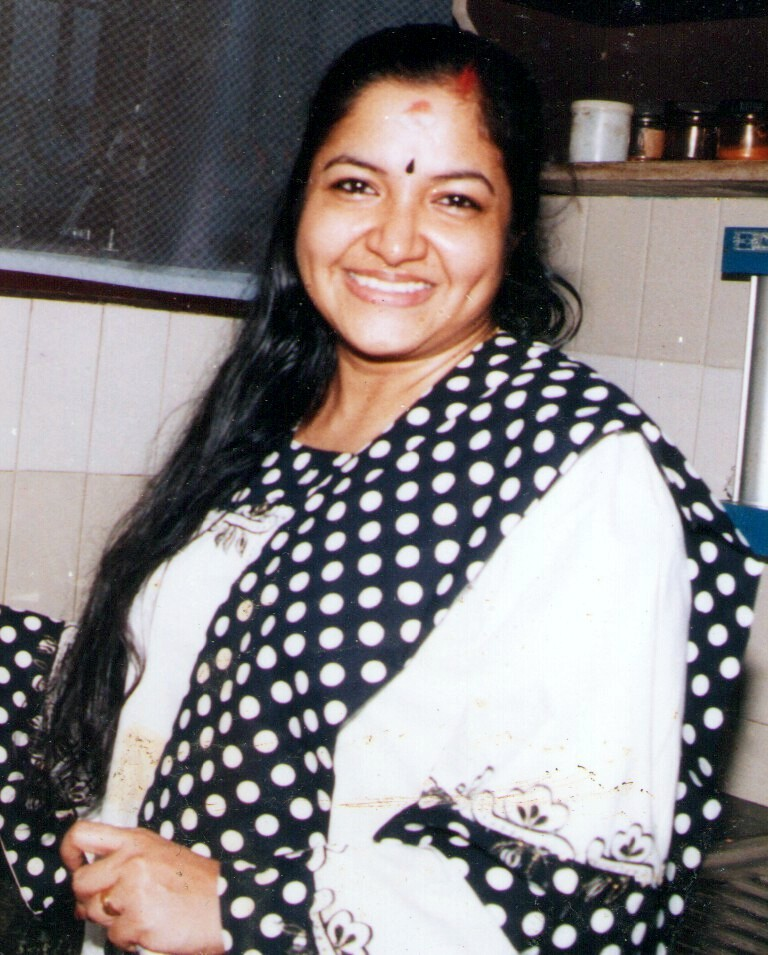
K.S. Chithra, singer

- Alex Paul – music director
- Arun alat
- Benny Dayal – playback singer
- Berny–Ignatius – music director duo
- K. S. Chithra – playback singer
- Deepak Dev – music composer, playback singer
- Dibu ninan thomas
- G. Venugopal – playback singer
- Girish Puthenchery – lyricist and writer
- Gopi Sundar – music director and keyboard artist
- Jassie Gift – music composer, playback singer
- Kaithapram Damodaran Namboothiri – lyricist
- Kapil kapilan
- Kannur Rajan – music composer
- Kozhikode Abdul Kader – playback singer
- KK (Krishnakumar Kunnath) – playback singer
- M. G. Sreekumar – playback singer and music director
- M. Jayachandran – music director and playback singer
- Madhu Balakrishnan – playback singer
- Manjari Babu – playback singer
- Mridula Warrier – playback singer
- Nikhil Mathew – playback singer
- Ouseppachan – music director
- P. Jayachandran – playback singer
- Pradip Somasundaran – playback singer
- Rahul Raj – music composer, playback singer
- Raveendran – music director
- Sabrina Setlur – German rapper and singer
- Sharreth – music director and playback singer
- Shweta Mohan – playback singer
- Sruthy Sasidharan – playback singer
- Stephen Devassy – pianist, music composer
- Sudeep Kumar – playback singer
- Sujatha Mohan – playback singer
- Unni Menon – playback singer
- Unnikrishnan – playback singer
- Vaishnav Girish – playback singer
- Vayalar Ramavarma – lyricist
- Vayalar Sarath Chandra Varma – lyricist
- Vidhu Prathap – playback singer
- Vijay Yesudas – playback singer
- Yesudas – classical singer and musician

== Artists, architects, painters, sculptors ==
Painters

- Raja Ravi Varma
- K. C. S. Paniker – founder of Cholamandal Artists' Village
- Namboothiri – painter, cartoonist and sculptor
- T. K. Padmini
- A. Ramachandran
- C. N. Karunakaran – Chairman of Kerala Lalitakala Academi
- Akkitham Narayanan
- Balan K. Nair
- Sekar Ayyanthole – art teacher, former president of Kerala Chithrakala Parishath
- M. V. Devan – artist and writer
- Jitheshji
- Bose Krishnamachari
- Paris Viswanathan
- Yusuf Arakkal
- Kavitha Balakrishnan – artist and art historian
- V. S. Valiathan – artist, Raja Ravivarma award winner
- C. L. Porinchukutty – Raja Ravi Varma Awardee for 2011
- K. Janardanan

Architects

- Eugene Pandala – architect and artist

Sculptors

- Kanayi Kunhiraman – sculptor, former chairman of Kerala Lalitakala Academy
- Balan Nambiar – sculptor, painter and research scholar
- Sasikrishnan – sculptor

Cartoonists

- Abu Abraham – cartoonist
- K. Shankar Pillai (1902–1989) – political cartoonist
- O. V. Vijayan – Cartoonist, writer
- P. K. Manthri – artist, cartoonist
- Gopikrishnan – cartoonist
- Dr. Jitheshji – World's Fastest Performing cartoonist & World Record holder in Speed Drawing
- Yesudasan – cartoonist; former chairman of Kerala Lalitakala Academy

== Sports ==
- (C) denotes players who have captained the national side.

=== Arm wrestling ===
- Joby Mathew

=== Athletics ===
- Anil Kumar
- Anilda Thomas
- Anju Bobby George
- Bobby Aloysius
- C. K. Lakshmanan
- Chitra K. Soman
- Ivan Jacob
- Jincy Phillip
- Jisna Mathew
- Joseph Abraham
- K.M. Beenamol
- K. M. Binu
- K. T. Irfan
- M. D. Valsamma
- Mayookha Johny
- Mercy Kuttan
- Mohammad Anas
- Molly Chacko
- O. P. Jaisha
- P. T. Usha
- P. U. Chitra
- Preeja Sreedharan
- Renjith Maheshwary
- Rosa Kutty
- Shiny Abraham
- Sini Jose
- Sinimol Paulose
- Suresh Babu
- T. C. Yohannan
- Tintu Lukka

=== Badminton ===
- George Thomas
- Jaseel P. Ismail
- P. C. Thulasi
- Prannoy H. S.
- Sanave Thomas
- U. Vimal Kumar
- V. Diju

=== Basketball ===
- Geethu Anna Jose (C)
- P. S. Jeena (C)

=== Canoeing ===
- Siji Kumar Sadanandan

=== Chess ===
- Arjun Vishnuvardhan
- Geetha Narayanan Gopal
- N R Anil Kumar
- Nihal Sarin
- Soumya Swaminathan

=== Cricket ===
==== India ====
- Abey Kuruvilla
- Abhishek Nayar
- Ajay Varma
- Basil Thampi
- Bhaskar Pillai
- Devdutt Padikkal
- Jalaj Saxena
- K. N. Ananthapadmanabhan
- Karun Nair
- Kelappan Thampuran (Kerala cricketer)
- P. Ranganathan
- Padmanabhan Prasanth
- Prasanth Parameswaran
- Raiphi Gomez
- Rohan Prem
- S. Sreesanth
- Sachin Baby
- Sandeep Warrier
- Sanju Samson
- Shreyas Iyer
- Sony Cheruvathur
- Sujith Somasunder
- Sunil Valson
- Tinu Yohannan
- VA Jagadeesh

==== Other countries ====
- Krishna Chandran (Uae)

=== Football ===
- Anas Edathodika
- Anil Kumar
- Ashique Kuruniyan
- C. K. Vineeth
- I. M. Vijayan (C)
- Jiju Jacob
- Jo Paul Ancheri (C)
- K. V. Dhanesh
- Mashoor Shereef
- Maymol Rocky
- Mohammed Rafi (footballer)
- Mundiyath Devdas
- O. Chandrasekhar
- P. B. A. Saleh
- Pappachen Pradeep
- Prasanth Karuthadathkuni
- Rahul K. P.
- Rino Anto
- S. S. Narayan
- Sahal Abdul Samad
- Suhair Vadakkepeedika
- T. Abdul Rahman
- Tahsin Jamshid (Qatari)
- Thenmadom Varghese
- U. Sharaf Ali
- Victor Manjila
- V. P. Sathyan (C)

=== Hockey ===
- Earnest Goodsir-Cullen
- Dinesh Nayak
- Helen Mary
- Manuel Frederick
- P. R. Sreejesh (C)

=== Kabaddi ===
- Shabeer Bapu Sharfudheen

=== Volleyball ===
- Aswani Kiran(C)
- Cyril C. Valloor (C)
- Jimmy George (C)
- K. J. Kapil Dev (C)
- K. Udayakumar (C)
- Minimol Abraham (C)
- Soorya Thottangal
- Tom Joseph (C)

=== Shooting ===
- Elizabeth Koshy

=== Swimming ===
- Sebastian Xavier
- Sajan Prakash

=== Table tennis ===
- A. Radhika Suresh

== Activists ==
- K. V. Rabiya – literacy campaigner, social worker
- Tiffany Brar – blind social worker
- Pramada Menon – queer feminist activist, stand-up comedian, gender and sexuality consultant, and co-founder of Creating Resources for Empowerment in Action
- Sally Varma – animal activist, humane educator, founder of Save A Life and Senior Campaigner in the Farm Animal Protection Campaign of Humane Society International/India
- Kannan Gopinathan – former Indian Administrative Service officer, now engaged in the Citizenship Amendment Act protests

== Performing artists ==
- Mani Madhava Chakyar (1989–1991) – Koodiyattam and Chakyar Koothu artist, Natya Shastra scholar
- Gopinath Muthukad – magician
- Tirur Nambissan – Kathakali singer
- Kalamandalam Hyderali – Kathakali singer
- Kalamandalam Gopi – Kathakali artist
- Kottakkal Sivaraman – Kathakali artist
- Guru Gopinath (1908–1987) – classical dancer and author
- Guru Chandrasekharan (1916–1998) – dancer and choreographer
- Mrinalini Sarabhai – dancer
- Kalamandalam Kshemavathy – dancer
- Athira – violin prodigy, Guinness World record holder
- Kim Thayil – guitarist
- Haripad Murukadas (b. 1971) – Nadaswaram player, music educator
- Paul Varghese – comedian
- Stephen Devassy – pianist and composer
- Balabhaskar – violinist and composer
- Chenganoor Raman Pillai – Kathakali artist
