= Vakkom (name) =

Vakkom is a given name. Notable people with the name include:

- Vakkom Bharathan 1926–2002), Islamic attorney
- Vakkom Abdul Khader (1917-1943), Indian freedom fighter
- Vakkom Moulavi (1873-1932), Islamic renaissance leader
- Vakkom Majeed (1909-2000), Indian freedom fighter
- Vakkom Purushothaman (1928-2023), Indian politician
