= Radhika Menon (merchant navy officer) =

Indian Navy officer

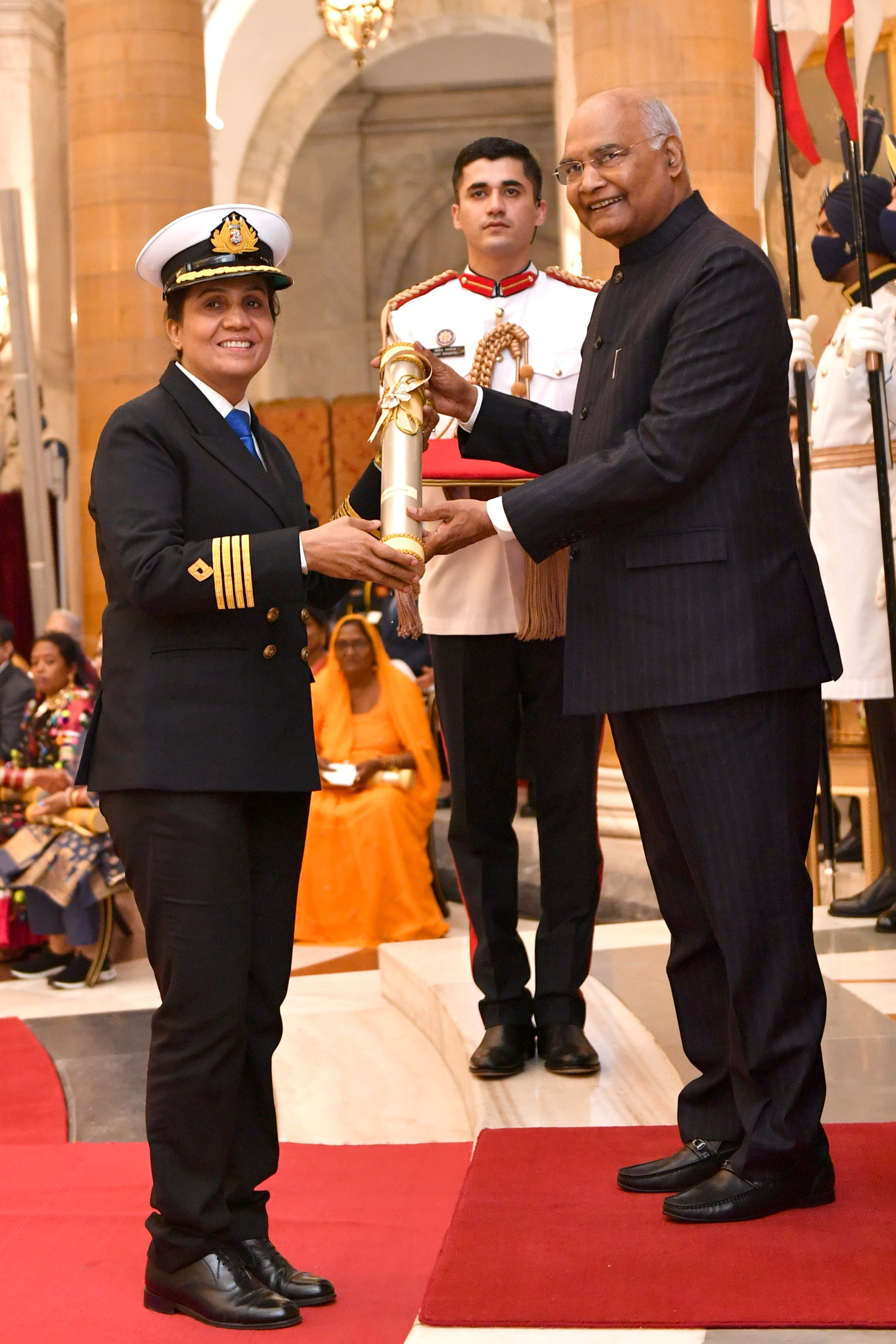
- getting the Nari Shakti Puraskar in 2022
- Born: Kodungallur, Kerala
- Education: All India Marine College, Kochi
- Occupation: naval officer
- Known for: First female captain of the Indian Merchant Navy

Radhika Menon is an Indian female Merchant Navy officer currently serving as the captain of the Indian Merchant Navy. She is also the first female captain of the Indian Merchant Navy who also led the oil products tanker Suvarna Swarajya. In 2016, Radhika also became the first woman to receive the IMO Award for Exceptional Bravery at Sea. She is well known for her rescue operation which she conducted successfully in June 2015 saving seven fishermen who were trapped for a week in a boat.

== Early life ==
She was born and raised in Kodungallur of Kerala. She completed a radio course at the All India Marine College in Kochi and initially began her career as a radio officer at the Shipping Corporation of India.

== Career ==
After a brief stint with Shipping Corporation of India, she became a prominent cadet of the Indian merchant Navy. In 2012, she was appointed as the captain of SCI ship in Indian Merchant Navy and became the first ever female captain of the Indian Merchant Navy. In the same year, she took charge as the captain of the oil tanker Suvarna Swarajya, measuring 21,827 gross tons.

She was awarded the International Maritime Organization Award in November 2016 for her successful courageous rescue operation which she led from the front in June 2015 rescuing seven fishermen who were trapped at the Bay of Bengal in a sinking boat which capsized due to engine failure and breakdown of the boat's anchor as a result of a sea storm. The Government of India nominated her for the relevant award recognising her national duty and also notably became the first woman to receive the IMO Bravery award.

Radhika also co-founded the International Women Seafarer's Foundation (IWSF) on 3 November 2017 along with fellow naval officers Suneeti Bala and Sharvani Mishra in Mumbai with the objective of motivating young women seafarers.

On 29 September 2019, she was honored by the Indian government as she featured in Bharat Ki Laxmi hashtag campaign which was introduced by the Indian Prime Minister Narendra Modi to celebrate the achievements of the Indian women as a part of the Mann Ki Baat series.

== See also ==
- List of people from Kerala
