= Nanditha K. S. =

Indian poet

- Nanditha's picture on her book Nandithayude Kavithakal
- Born: 21 May 1969; Wayanad, India
- Died: 17 January 1999 (aged 29)
- Education: Master of Arts
- Alma mater: University of Calicut
- Occupations: Poet, lecturer
- Notable work: Nandithayude Kavithakal

Nanditha K. S. was a poet from Kerala who wrote poems in Malayalam and English. Her poems were discovered in her diary after her death and published as a collection.

== Biography ==
Nanditha was born on May 21, 1969, in Madakkimala, Wayanad district to M. Sreedhara Menon, who retired as General Manager at Kalpetta Cooperative Bank and Prabhavathy Menon. After her schooling in Government Ganpath Model Girls High School, Chalappuram, she completed her higher education from Zamorin's Guruvayurappan College, Farook College, University of Calicut English Department and Mother Teresa Women's University, Chennai. After completing her B.A. and M.A. degrees, she worked as guest lecturer for English at the Wayanad Muttil Muslim Orphanage Arts and Science College. She applied to pursue a Ph.D. on the topic of "Personal Freedom – A Dilemma: An iconoclastic approach to the ideals of womanhood with reference to the novels of Gail Godwin."

Nanditha took her life on 17 January 1999. The reason why Nandita committed suicide remains unknown. After her death, her parents discovered a diary of her poems which she had not shared with anyone. A collection of her poems written between 1985 through 1993 were published in a book form as Nandithayude Kavithakal, under the initiative of the Malayalam literary critic, M. M. Basheer. The first edition of the book was published in 2002 and ninth edition (ISBN 978-9385269585) in 2021 by Olive Books.

Death and love were common themes in her poems. Though most of her poems were in Malayalam she also wrote in English. Her life was the subject of the film titled Nanditha released in 2017.
