= Salim Gangadharan =

Indian banker and incumbent Chairman of the South Indian Bank

PCGM at Reserve Bank of India
- In office 1 April 2012 – 31 October 2013
- Preceded by: A. K. Bera

Chairman at South Indian Bank
- Incumbent
- Assumed office 16 January 2014
- Preceded by: Amitabh Guha

Personal details
- Born: 30 October 1953 (age 72) Kerala, India
- Education: Master of Arts (Economics)
- Alma mater: University of Kerala
- Occupation: Banker
- Known for: Regional Director, Kerala and Lakshadweep

Salim Gangadharan (born 30 October 1953) is an Indian banker and the incumbent Chairman of the South Indian Bank. He was also Principal Chief General Manager of Reserve Bank of India and Regional Director for Kerala and Lakshadweep. He has also been Director of Syndicate Bank and Central Bank of India.

== Early life and education ==
Salim Gangadharan was born on 30 October 1953 in Kerala. He obtained his post graduation degree in economics from University of Kerala. He is also a certified associate of the Indian Institute of Banking and Finance.

== Career and achievements ==
Gangadharan joined the Reserve Bank of India as a Grade-B Officer. He worked in the field of banking supervision, foreign exchange management and financial market regulation. He was a member of faculty at the Bankers Training College, Mumbai. He also worked with Central Bank of Oman for five years. In the year 2006 he became Chief General Manager of the Foreign Exchange Department of RBI. In March 2011, he was appointed as Regional Director for West Bengal, Sikkim, and Andaman and Nicobar Islands and Member Secretary of the Eastern Local Board of the RBI. In April 2012 he was appointed as Regional Director for the State of Kerala and Lakshadweep. Subsequently, he was elevated to the post of Principal Chief General Manager.

Gangadharan joined South Indian Bank as an independent director in January 2014. Later that year he took over from Amitabha Guha as non-executive Chairman of the bank.

== Major contributions ==
Salim Gangadharan has made seminal contribution to foreign exchange regulation in India as the convener of the Task Force of Capital Account Convertibility. He is an advisor for the National Institute of Education and Training. He is also an advisor for the National Institute of Skill Enhancement.

== Important assignments ==
- Principal Chief General Manager, Reserve Bank of India
- Regional Director, Kerala and Lakshadweep
- Regional Director, [West Bengal, Sikkim, Andaman and Nicobar Islands] and [Secretary, LB, RBI]
- Chairman, South Indian Bank
- Director, Central Bank of India
- Director, Syndicate Bank
- Director, [National Clearing Corporation]
- Director, [Kerala Infrastructure Investment Fund Board]
- Short-term Expert [IMF]

== See also ==
South Indian Bank
