= Prahlad Vadakkepat =

Robotics researcher

Prahlad Vadakkepat is a researcher in the field of robotics and is the founder and general secretary of the Federation of International Robot-soccer Association (FIRA) and in 2013 is its general secretary. He is an associate professor at the National University of Singapore. His research is in the areas of Humanoids, Neuro-Fuzzy Controllers, Distributed robotic systems, Biomorphic Robots, Intelligent Control techniques and Frugal Innovation.

== Early life and education ==
Vadakkepat grew up in the Palghat District of Kerala, India.

Vadakkepat received B.Tech. from NSS College of Engineering in electrical engineering (1986), M.Tech. (1989) and PhD (1996) degrees from Indian Institute of Technology Madras. He was with the Regional Engineering College Calicut National Institute of Technology Calicut, India as lecturer (1991–96).

Vadakkepat pursued postdoctoral studies (1996–98) at the Korea Advanced Institute of Science and Technology KAIST. He is a recipient of the Korea Science and Engineering Foundation KOSEF fellowship. In 1999 he moved to the National University of Singapore.

== Career ==
Vadakkepat's work in FIRA has led to several start ups in robotics and embedded systems. He has toured Europe, Asia and India to popularize FIRA and robotic competitions. He was the general chair to the FIRA RoboWorld Cup and Congress in Singapore, 2005, in Incheon, and in Bangalore 2010.

Vadakkepat is the founder and director of Robhatah Robotic Solutions in Singapore and Bangalore. He initiated the international conference on Computational Intelligence, Robotics and Autonomous Systems. Vadakkepat is an associate editor of the International Journal of Humanoid Robotics. His Humanoid robot and robot soccer teams have won several international prizes: first prize and overall championship in Humanoids at the FIRA Robot World Cup (Germany 2006, Singapore 2005 and Austria 2003), First Prize in open category in Singapore Robotic Games (2004) and Second prize in FIRA 2004.

Vadakkepat is a member of the Confederation of Indian Industries National Committee on Robotics since 2009.

Vadakkepat has served as the secretary to the IEEE Singapore Section for the year 2005 and as technical activity coordinator to the Region 10 (Asia-Pacific) in 2001–2002. He has been a senior member of IEEE (USA, since 2005). He is a fellow of the Institute of Electronics and Telecommunications Engineers, India.

Vadakkepat is actively involved in Frugal Innovation, for which he visits and promotes projects at the grass-root level. He has taken his students to rural hospitals in Maharashtra to simplify medical treatment processes. He is the founding Editor-in-Chief of the Springer Journal for Frugal Innovation. He runs the 'Ideas for Life' social innovation challenge which seeks design innovations which are simple, novel and useful.

Vadakkepat is featured in a number of newspapers and TV shows in several countries (India, Singapore, USA, Korea, Spain, China and France). He has publications in several international journals.

He is the founder of the Grama Samskrithy Foundation Palakkad.

Vadakkepat is a trustee to the Aryanet Trust which manages Aryanet Institute of Technology, Palakkad, Kerala.
