= Paul A. Kattuman =

Professor of Economics

Paul Kattuman
- Born: Kerala, India
- Occupation: Academic

Academic background
- Education: Professor
- Alma mater: Calicut University, Cambridge University & Trinity College, Cambridge (MPhil, PhD)
- Doctoral advisor: Prof David Newbery

Academic work
- Discipline: Economist
- Sub-discipline: Econometrics
- Institutions: Cambridge University

Paul A. Kattuman is a Professor of Economics at Cambridge Judge Business School, University of Cambridge and Director of Studies in Management and Fellow at Corpus Christi College, Cambridge.

== Education ==
Kattuman completed his schooling at Sainik School in Kerala, India, and earned his BA and MA in Economics from the University of Calicut. He started his career as an economist in the Indian Economic Service, working briefly at the Ministry of Finance, Government of India. He obtained his M.Phil. and Ph.D. degrees in Economics from the University of Cambridge (Trinity College and the Faculty of Economics), specializing in the theory and empirics of firm growth under the supervision of Professor David Newbery.

== Career ==
He began his academic career as a lecturer in the Department of Economics at Durham University, before returning to Cambridge as a Senior Research Fellow in the Department of Applied Economics, and a Fellow of Corpus Christi College.

Through his career Kattuman has held several visiting positions, including at Harvard University Kennedy School of Government, Harvard Department of Statistics, and the Harvard Data Science Initiative. He has also served as a visiting professor at Université Paris-Est Créteil and Universidad Complutense de Madrid. Throughout the COVID-19 pandemic, Kattuman held advisory roles, providing forecasts and analysis every week to Public Health England, the NHS in the East of England, and the governments of Kerala, Tamil Nadu, and Punjab in India.

== Selected publications ==
Kattuman’s research has been published in a range of academic journals, including interdisciplinary journals such as Harvard Data Science Review and the Journal of the Royal Society Interface, recently. A contribution, developed in collaboration with Andrew Harvey, is the Harvey-Kattuman model for epidemic forecasting.
