= Moothiringode Bhavathrāthan Namboothiripad =

- Born: 4 May 1903; Palakkad, British India
- Died: 3 July 1944 (aged 41); Palakkad, Kerala
- Occupation: author
- Writing career
- Genre: Fiction

Moothiringode Bhavathrāthan Namboothiripad was a Malayalam author who is known for his work Aphante Makal which had great social relevance in pre-independent Kerala society.

== Life ==
Bhavathrāthan was born on 4 May 1903 to the renowned Namboothiri family of Moothiringode. His father was Subramanyan Namboothiripad, an eminent scholar of Sankskrit and mother was Savithri Antharjanam. At the age of five after the sacred thread ceremony, he was sent to the Panjal Veda School to study Samaveda. After his studies there he returned home and further studied Sanskrit, Vedas and also poetry, drama, literature and nyāya shāstra under his father. In 1921, he married Uma Antharjanam.

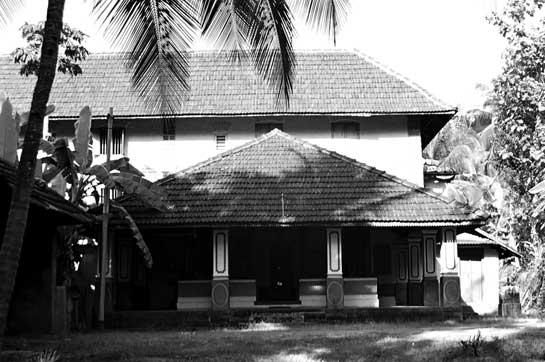
Moothiringode Mana, Palakkad.The home of Bhavathrāthan Namboothiripad

Bhavathrāthan became a part of the social reforms taking place in the pre-independent Kerala. He was an active member of the Namboothiri Yogashema Sabha. He voiced his views against the atrocities that existed within the Kerala society especially within the Namboothiris. He fought for better position for Namboothiri women and their right to equality and education.

He died on 1944-07-03 at the age of 42.

== Work ==
In 1933, Bhavathrāthan wrote Aphante Makal (അപ്ഫന്റെ മകൾ). Aphante Makal translates to Uncle's Daughter. The novel depicts the plight of younger brothers in Brahmin families due to the system of primogeniture and the emotional and legal contradictions resulting from its system of inheritance. Bhavathrāthan used his literary talents against to bring about great social reforms to the Namboothiri society.

His other famous works include Poonkola, Marupuram and Ātmahuti.

== Trivia ==
- Though much younger, O M C Narayanan Nambudiripad was Bhavathrāthan's uncle.
- Bhavathrāthan invited a then young E. M. S. Namboodiripad to write an introduction to his novel Aphante Makal.
- In a few stages of V.T.Bhattathipad's famous play Adukkalayil Ninnu Arangathekku, Bhavathrāthan played a special role of a Chomathiri which was not there in the actual script.
