= Chandiroor Divakaran =

Indian poet and song-writer

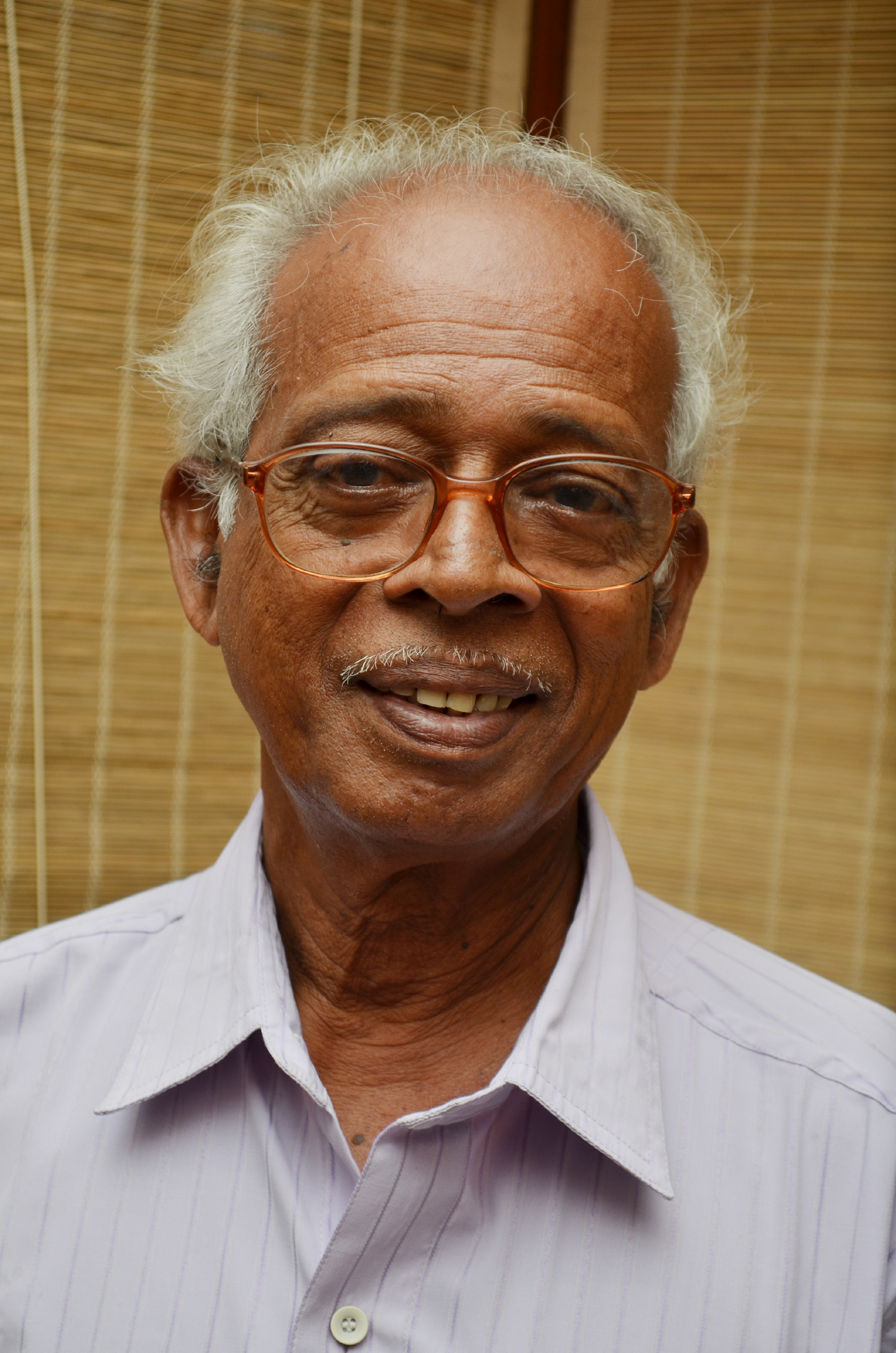
- Born: Kalathil Makki Divakaran; 10 May 1946 (age 80); Chandiroor, Kerala, British India
- Occupations: Writer, author, poet, songwriter
- Writing career
- Language: Malayalam
- Years active: 1965–present
- Genres: Fiction and poetry

Kalathil Makki Divakaran, also known by his pen name Chandiroor Divakaran, is a Malayalam–language poet and folk-song writer from Kerala, India. He was awarded the Ambedkar National Award in 2011 for his overall contribution to Malayalam literature.

== Works ==
- Radha – (1965)
- Parnnupoya Inakkuyil – (1966)
- Malsyaghandhi – (1968)
- Sheriffa – (1969)
- Udayavum Kathu – (1977)
- Aazhathilodungiya Jeevithangal – (1980)
- Madhya Durantham – (1982)
- Kudumbini – (1990) (Short story)
- Muzhakkuka Panjajanyam – (1991)
- Chakara – (1994) (Children's poetry)
- Pakal pakshiyude geetham – (1996)
- Desapuranam – (1996) (Children's poetry)
- Arani – (1999)
- Pattini Theyyam – (2003)
- Ulsavam – (2003) (Children's poetry)
- Vishadhaparvam – (2004)
- Viswakarmakeerthanangal – (2007)
- Iniyethradhooram – (2008)
- Mounanombaram – (2011)
- Karnikaram – (2013)

== Awards ==
- Poppal Gana Award – (1976)
- Jnanodhayam Sabha P.K.M Vayanasala Award – (1977)
- DYFI Award – (Palluruthy Zone, 1978)
- Chethana Award – (1979)
- Mathrubhumi Award – (Thrissur District, 1981)
- Samastha Kerala Sahithya Parishath Award – (1985)
- Yuvabhushanam Vayanasala Award – (1987)
- Ujala Award – (1994)
- Surendran Memorial Award – (1994) – Vishadha
- Padit Karuppan Sahithya Award – (1994)
- Bodhi Sahithya Puraskaram – (2003)
- Jusse Award – (2005)
- Krishna Award – (2008)
- P.K. Thevar Award – (2009)
- Akshyadeepapuraskaram – (2010)
- Ambedkar Award – (2011)
- Kavi Thilakan Pandit KP Karuppan Smaraka Puraskaram – (2025)
