= Choorayi Kanaran =

First Deputy Collector of India

- Born: 1812; Thalassery, Malabar District, British India Kannur, Kerala, India)
- Died: 1876 (aged 63–64); Thalassery
- Occupation: First Deputy Collector In India
- Awards: Rao Bahadur

Choorayi Kanaran (1812–1876) was the first Deputy Collector of India. He was born into a prominent family. He was also the first Municipal Chairman of Kerala.

== Biography ==
Kanaran was born in 1812, the son of Kummai Choi, a jailer in a prominent Thiyyar family in Thalassery Kerala. At the age of 17. Work was the norm at the time. He remained in that position until 1832. Many of the British officials were Telugus and North Indians. They also had an excellent position in governance. So Kanaran studied Tamil, Telugu and Hindi. Gundert was educated in Malayalam and Sanskrit by his in Uracherry Gurukkals, where he taught Malayalam and Sanskrit. He appointed Kanaran as the court clerk. Judge Strange, who left Gundert's bungalow in Illinois to live in, also liked Kanaran's work ethic. He appointed Kanaran as the head of the court. As a result, in 1859, Kanaran was appointed Deputy Collector and Magistrate of the South Malabar Region first deputy collector in India. He appointed Deputy Collector, Uppot Kannan and after another Judge EK Krishnan was appointed.

Churyayi Kanaran was the first Indian (and Malayali) to rise to the rank of Deputy Collector during a period when the position of "Collector" was strictly reserved for the British. He was a master diplomat and a man of immense intellectual prowess.

=== Cultural Roots and the "Thousand Bows" ===
Before the British arrived in Thalassery, the region was part of the Mannanar (Thiyya) Dynasty. The most significant festival of this ancient city is the festival at Andalur Kavu. The administrative authority of this temple (known as the Kottil) belonged to six Thiyya ancestral houses (Tharavadu) held by the "Four Thara Achans." This center of power functioned as an autonomous region.

A unique tradition exists here: when a boy is born in these four regions, a small bow and arrow are made in his name and offered to the temple, dedicating the child to the service of the shrine. Because thousands of such bows accumulate by the end of the year, the shrine is famously addressed as "Andalure Aayiram Ville" (The Thousand Bows of Andalur). Churyayi Kanaran emerged from this tradition of warriors dedicated to protecting "Dharma."

=== Early Life and Rise to Power ===
Born in 1812 to Kummayi Choyi (a jailer), Kanaran joined the service as a jailer at the age of 17 following his father's death. Recognizing that many British officials were from North India or Andhra, he mastered Tamil, Telugu, and Hindi. He also attained scholarship in Malayalam and Sanskrit from the renowned Uracheri Gurukkals (who also taught Hermann Gundert).

His linguistic brilliance and problem-solving skills impressed British judges and officials. He rose through various ranks:

Court Clerk and Sheristadar: Appointed by Judge G.S. Greenway and Judge Strange.

Head Munshi (1848): Appointed by Malabar Collector H.V. Conolly.

=== The Diplomat Who Avoided Bloodshed ===
Kanaran was legendary for resolving conflicts without firing a single shot.

Resolving Riots: He settled major uprisings in Manjeri (1849), Kolathur (1851), and Mattannur (1852) through dialogue rather than military force.

The Sayyid Fazal Incident: When Sayyid Fazal Pookoya Thangal was prepared for a confrontation with the British, Kanaran went alone, without guards, to meet him. His diplomacy led to a peaceful resolution where the Thangal decided to leave for Arabia, preventing a massive bloodbath.

=== The "Get Out" Incident ===
Once, a high-ranking British official from North India entered the Deputy Collector's office without permission. Expecting to see a white man, he was shocked to see an Indian. He rudely barked at Kanaran, ordering him to stand up and show respect.

Infuriated by the arrogance and the unauthorized entry, Kanaran gave the official a legendary "reply" in the officer's own language, ending with a firm "Get Out!" The official was so stunned and intimidated by Kanaran’s authority that he fled the office. Despite the era's strict laws, the British could not dismiss or punish him—they realized that the stability of British administration in Thalassery rested on Kanaran's backbone.

=== Retirement and Unique Pension ===
Kanaran retired on December 31, 1869, after 39 years of service. He requested that his pension be equal to his last drawn salary, arguing that he could not maintain his lifestyle otherwise. In a rare move, Lord Argyll (Secretary of State for India) approved this, granting him a full pension of 600 Rupees in recognition of his invaluable service. He was the first Indian to receive his full salary as a pension.

=== Social Reform and Legacy ===
In retirement, he served as the first Malayali Vice-President (Chairman) of the Thalassery Municipality. His contributions include:

Infrastructure: He built the Narangappuram-Manjodi Road (often called C.K. Road) and the Vadikkal-Pallikkunnu Court Road.

Education: He started the first school for girls in Thalassery and promoted Sanskrit education for all castes.

Social Reform: He encouraged people to change their attire (wearing shirts) and attempted to establish a temple for all communities in 1870, decades before Sri Narayana Guru’s Jagannath Temple.

=== Final Tribute ===
Churyayi Kanaran passed away on October 18, 1876. Sir William Robinson, the Governor of Madras, wrote in his condolence message:

"I have never met another officer who possessed such a combination of efficiency, personality, integrity, and amazing self-confidence as Kanaran. He was one of those great souls destined to act in times of crisis."
