= Sasikrishnan =

Indian artist

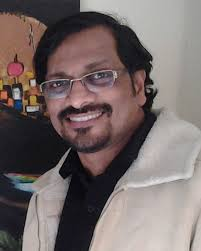
- Born: 1966 (age 59–60); Vatakara, Kerala

Sasikrishnan is a Kuwait-based Indian artist, sculptor and the founder of the Philaesthoism art movement.

== Biography ==
Sasikrishnan was born in Vatakara in 1966.

In the early 2000s, he founded the artistic practice of Philaesthoism which underscores the need for incorporating the subtle elements of love and beauty found in human relations into art.

He is married to mathematician Beena Sasikrishnan and the couple have two sons, Anandu and Aditya.

== Selected exhibitions ==
- 2015 IARTCO International Exhibition, Ahmedabad
- 2016 Mind, Space and Beauty - Lalitha Kala Academy, Durbar Hall, Cochin, Kerala
- 2016 Philaesthoism - Chithra Kala Parishath, Bangalore, Karnataka
- 2017 Marghazi Festival Exhibition, Chennai
- 2017 Incredible India Exhibition, Lulu Center, Kuwait
- 2017 Kuwait Art Association (organized by National Bank of Kuwait), Kuwait
- 2018 Solo exhibition at Art Soul Life Gallery, Noida
- 2018 World Environment Day Exhibition, Kuwait
