= Shabeer Bapu Sharfudheen =

Indian Kabaddi athlete

Personal information
- Nationality: Indian
- Born: 3 August 1986 (age 39) Palakkad, Kerala
- Employer: State bank of Mysore
- Height: 1.81 m (5 ft 11 in)
- Weight: 84 kg (185 lb)

Sport
- Country: India
- Sport: Kabaddi
- Position: Raider
- Event: Franchise
- League: Pro Kabaddi League
- Team: Tamil Thalaivas U Mumba 2014–2016, 2017; Jaipur Pink Panthers 2016 Dabang Delhi 2018

Shabeer Bapu Sharfudheen is an Indian Kabaddi player. He was selected by State Bank of India – Mysore to play the sport. He is from Kerala, living in Ummini of Palakkad District, a well farming area of rice. He is one among the national sportsmen from the locality.

He played at the India camp from 2011–2014.

== Pro Kabaddi League ==
He was purchased by U Mumba, the U Mumba franchisee of Pro Kabaddi League. He played for U Mumba for 2 seasons before switching alliance to Jaipur Pink Panthers for season 3 and season 4 before returning to U Mumba for season 5

He is bought by Tamil Thalaivas in 2019 auction.
