= Joby Mathew =

Indian arm wrestler

Joby Mathew (born 1976) is an Indian international arm wrestler. Mathew has won gold medal for India in 29th World Arm Wrestling Championship held at Hispanico, Spain. He has also won five gold medals in World Dwarf Games 2013 in Michigan, organized by Dwarf Athletic Association of America. Joby Mathew is a physically challenged person by birth with 60% disabilities Mathew has a height of 3 feet 5 inches and stunted legs, which is a condition caused by proximal femoral focal deficiency (PFFD).

Joby Mathew has won medals at multiple international events.

Joby, who works for the Bharat Petroleum Corporation as a sports trainer, is also the first wheel-chaired fencer in India, holds a brown belt in karate, is a member of the Kerala state parasailing and paragliding team and is a keen swimmer.

Rotary Club of Cochin Knights honoured him by giving their 9th vocational excellence award on 20 October 2013.
