= Ajay Prabhakar =

Indian researcher and author (born 1978)

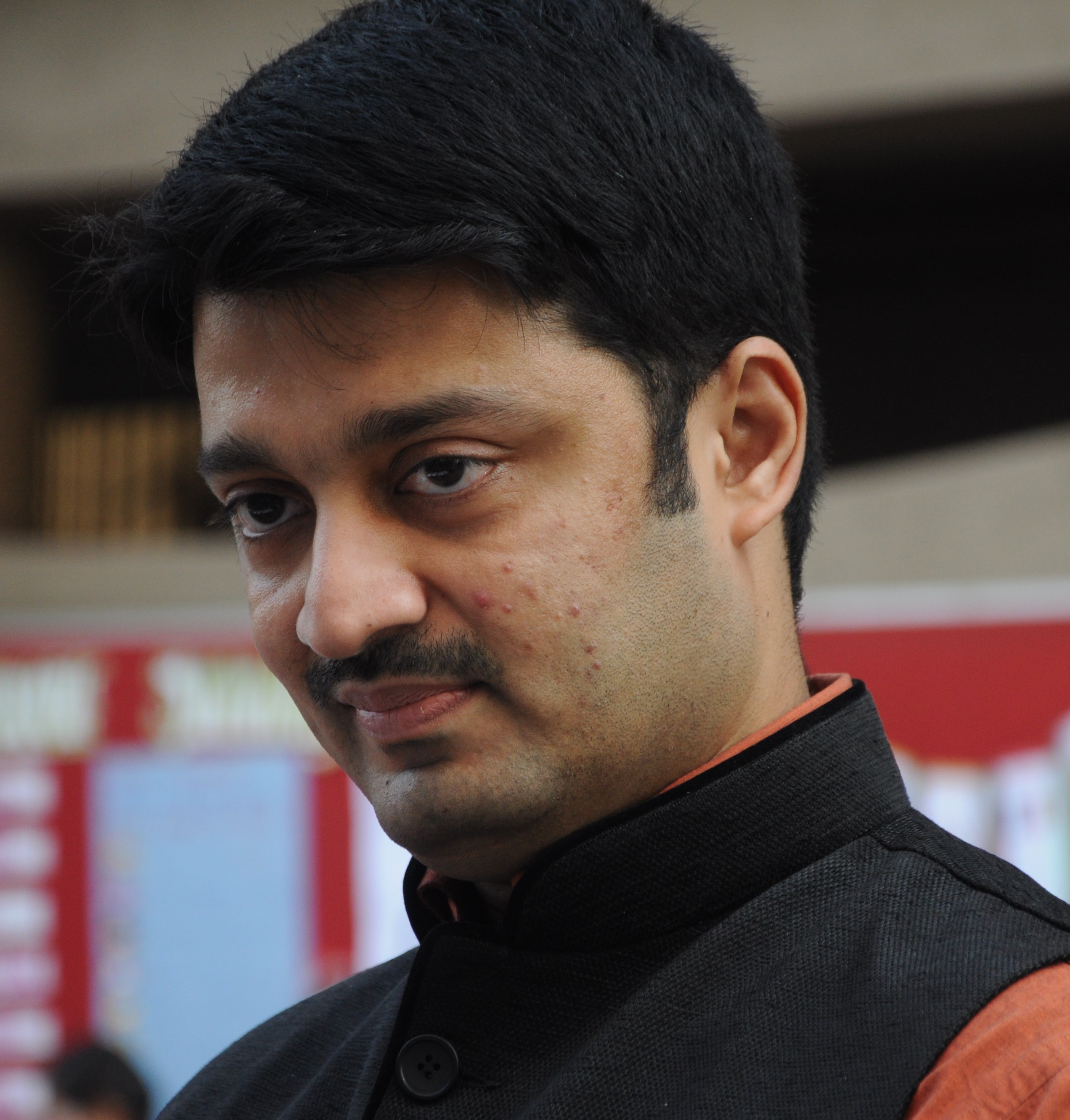
- Born: Ajay Prabhakar
- Occupation: Researcher, author, technologist, educationist
- Language: English

Website
- ajayprabhakar.com

Ajay Prabhakar is an Indian researcher and author who, until 2014, was a United Nations Country Programme officer. He has worked with the Nigerian Presidency in the Arts and Culture parastatal under President Olusegun Obasanjo. Prabhakar still serves as a consultant to the United Nations and other international bodies.

== Career ==
Prabhakar is the author of six books, one of which are being used in a university in the United States of America. He has done several projects under the aegis of the United Nations in the domains of education, sustainable development, research, and archaeology.

Prabhakar is the head of several research projects in Africa, Asia, Europe and the USA. He has worked on multiple archaeological research projects with the Cross River State Government, specifically with the Ministry of Arts and Culture, under then Governor Donald Duke, which included conservation, advocacy, sensitization and preservation of the Ikom Monoliths.

Other sites include the Homo Erectus site in Okigwe, Monolithic writings in Ireland and the lost city of Igbale Aiye, Benin. His work has been referred to in other research projects.

Together with Catherine Acholonu, he is the co-founder of the Catherine Acholonu Research Foundation (CARC).

Ajay Prabhakar currently serves as the Founder and Chairman of Pioneers Nation, an organization that deals with research in the domains of archaeology, archiving and education.

== Bibliography ==
Books

- The Gram Code of African Adam: Stone Books and Cave Libraries, Reconstructing 450,000 Years of Africa's Lost Civilizations, 2005
- Windows XP and Productivity Programs (Microsoft UP Project Handbook)
- The Lost Testament of the Ancestors of Adam: Unearthing Heliopolis/Igbo Ukwu – The Celestial City of the Gods of Egypt and India, 2010
- Impressions - A Handbook on Research and Processes
- They Lived Before Adam: Pre-Historic Origins of the Igbo – The Never-Been-Ruled (Ndi Igbo since 1.6 million B.C.)
- A Different Path

White papers

- Comparison and Implementation of Educational Grass root models in Asia and Africa
- Olaudah Equiano – A Linguistic and Anthropological Search, The Journal of Commonwealth Literature. 22.1 (1987). 5–16.
- The Igbo Roots of Olaudah Equiano, 1995, revised 2007.

== See also ==
- List of Indian writers
