= Vakkom Bharathan =

Indian lawyer and trade unionist (1926–2002)

Vakkom Bharathan (1 November 1926 – 12 July 2002) was an attorney, CPI M leader and trade union leader of Kerala, India. He held various government administrative positions in Kerala. He was elected as the first panchayat president of Vakkom in 1953. He served as chairman of Plantation Corporation of Kerala Ltd in 1980. In 1976 he was private secretary to Kerala Industries Minister, K. R. Gowri Amma. Later in 1996, he was private secretary to Kerala Industries Minister Susheela Gopalan.
