= List of people from Thiruvananthapuram =

List of notable people who were born or settled in Thiruvananthapuram, Kerala.

== Former rulers of Travancore ==
- Marthanda Varma
- Sethu Lakshmi Bayi
- Dharma Raja
- Ayilyam Thirunal
- Swathi Thirunal Rama Varma
- Moolam Thirunal
- Chithira Thirunal Balarama Varma

== Religion and spirituality ==
- Sree Narayana Guru
- Ayyankali
- Vakkom Moulavi
- Chattampi Swamikal
- Sade Guru Shivalingadasa Swamigal
- Sri M

== Freedom fighters ==
- Vakkom Abdul Khader
- Annie Mascarene
- Accamma Cherian

== Politicians ==
- Pattom A. Thanu Pillai
- Shashi Tharoor
- Vakkom Purushothaman
- Varkala Radhakrishnan
- K. Muraleedharan
- A. Sampath
- V. Sivankutty
- V. S. Sivakumar
- Kadakampally Surendran
- V. K. Prasanth
- K S Sabarinathan
- G Karthikeyan
- M. Vijayakumar
- C. Jayan Babu
- Neelalohithadasan Nadar
- O. Rajagopal
- Arya Rajendran
- V. Muraleedharan
- Rajeev Chandrasekhar
- Adv VV Rajesh

== Musicians ==
- Swathithirunal
- B. Sasikumar
- K. S. Chithra
- M. Jayachandran
- Bichu Thirumala
- Hariharan
- L. Athira Krishna - violinist
- Vidhu Prathap
- M. G. Radhakrishnan - music director and vocalist
- M. G. Sreekumar
- Neyyattinkara Vasudevan
- V. Madhusoodanan Nair
- G. Venugopal
- Sujatha Mohan
- Balabhaskar
- Job Kurian
- Ishaan Dev
- Jassie Gift
- Prince Rama Varma
- Najim Arshad
- Abhaya Hiranmayi
- Akhila Anand
- Raftaar (rapper)
- Vinayak Sasikumar
- Vishnu Vijay

== Painters ==
- Raja Ravi Varma
- Celia Paul
- A. Ramachandran

== Sculptor ==
- Kanayi Kunhiraman

== Performing artists, Indian dance ==
- Guru Gopinath
- Gopinath Muthukad
- L. Athira Krishna
- Neena Prasad
- Guru Chandrasekharan
- Madavoor Vasudevan Nair
- G. S. Pradeep
- Rajashree Warrier
- Gayathri Govind

== Architects ==
- Laurie Baker - architect, born in England, settled in Thiruvananthapuram
- Gopalan Nair Shankar (G. Shankar) - received Padma Shri award in 2011

== Science ==
- V. N. Krishnamurthy - ex-Dy. Director, VSSC; ex-Director, ISRO-UoP Cell
- G. Madhavan Nair - ISRO Chairman
- Thanu Padmanabhan - Indian theoretical physicist
- K. S. S. Nambooripad -Mathematician

== Social Reformers ==
- Ayyankali
- Vakkom Moulavi
- Narayana Guru - also a poet
- Chattampi Swamikal - also a poet and prose writer

== Writers ==
- Kumaran Asan - poet
- A. Ayyappan
- K. A. Beena - journalist and author
- Kilimanoor Chandran
- Ulloor S. Parameswara Iyer - poet
- Sugathakumari - poet
- Gopi Kottoor - poet
- O. N. V. Kurup - poet
- Mali Madhavan Nair
- V. Madhusoodhanan Nair
- George Onakkoor
- Ayyappa Paniker
- C. V. Raman Pillai
- E. V. Krishna Pillai
- Kesari Balakrishna Pillai
- N. Krishna Pillai
- Sreekanteswaram Padmanabha Pillai - author of Shabda Tharavali
- Kilimanoor Ramakanthan
- Sukumar
- Irayimman Thampi
- Bichu Thirumala - Malayalam poet
- Swathi Thirunal
- A. R. Raja Raja Varma
- Vijayakrishnan
- Poovachal Khader - poet
- Vellayani Arjunan

== Military personnel ==
- Radhakrishnan Nair Harshan
- Admiral R. Hari Kumar

== Jurists ==
- N. R. Madhava Menon – member of Centre-State Relations Commission of the Government of India; former VC of National Law School of India University, Bangalore and NUJS Kolkata
- K. S. Paripoornan – Chief Justice of Patna High Court (1994) and Justice of the Supreme Court of India (1994–1997)

== Sports ==
- K. N. Ananthapadmanabhan - Umpire (ex-Cricketer)
- Sanju Samson - Cricketer
- Aneil Nambiar (born 1984) - Cricketer
- Jobby Justin - Footballer
- Padmanabhan Prasanth - Cricketer
- Prannoy H. S. - Badminton player
- Raiphi Vincent Gomez - Cricketer
- P. Ranganathan - ex-cricketer
- Rohan Prem - Cricketer
- Bijoy Varghese - Footballer
- Britto P. M. - Footballer

== IT ==
- Kris Gopalakrishnan - CEO of Infosys
- Raj Subramaniam - CEO of FedEx

== Actors and directors ==
- Sathyan
- Prem Nazir
- Madhu
- Mohanlal
- Prithviraj Sukumaran
- Priyadarshan
- Abhirami
- Ahaana Krishna
- Aishwarya Lekshmi
- Alencier Ley Lopez
- Ambika
- Aneesh Ravi
- Anil Murali
- Annie Shaji Kailas
- Appani Sarath
- Arthana Binu
- Arun Kumar Aravind
- Arya Rohit
- Baiju
- Bharat Gopy
- Biju Pappan
- Biju Sopanam
- Chippy
- Deepu Karunakaran
- Devi Ajith
- Gokul Suresh
- Indrajith Sukumaran
- Indrans
- Iniya
- Isha Sharvani
- Jagadish
- Jagathy Sreekumar
- J.C. Daniel
- Joshi
- Kalaranjini
- Kalpana
- Kani Kusruti
- Karamana Janardanan Nair
- Karthika
- Keerikkadan Jose
- Keerthy Suresh
- Kochu Preman
- K. P. A. C. Azeez
- Krishnakumar
- Krishnankutty Nair
- Lalitha
- Maala Parvathi
- Mahesh Narayanan
- Mallika Sukumaran
- Manikuttan
- Maniyanpilla Raju
- Manjima Mohan
- Manju Pillai
- Menaka Sureshkumar
- Mithun Ramesh
- Murali Gopy
- N. L. Balakrishnan
- Namitha Pramod
- Nandu
- Nayanthara Chakravarthy
- Nazriya Nazim
- Noby Marcose
- Nyla Usha
- Padmini
- Poojappura Ravi
- Prajesh Sen
- Pranav Mohanlal
- Prathap Pothan
- Premkumar
- Priyanka Nair
- Radha
- Ragini
- Rajasenan
- Ravi Vallathol
- Rojin Thomas
- R. S. Vimal
- Saji Surendran
- Sajin Baabu
- Sakhi Thomas
- Sangeeth Sivan
- Santosh Sivan
- Senthil Krishna
- Shafna
- Shaji Kailas
- Shaji N. Karun
- Shobhana
- Shyamaprasad
- Sithara
- Sona Nair
- Suchitra Murali
- Sudheer Karamana
- Sujith Vasudev
- Sukumaran
- Sukumari
- Suraj Venjaramoodu
- Suresh Gopi
- Thikkurissy Sukumaran Nair
- Thulasidas
- Urvashi
- Vatsala Rajagopal
- Venu Nagavally
- Vijayakumar
- Vijayasree
- Vinduja Menon

== Doctors ==
- Padmanabhan Palpu
- C.O. Karunakaran
- M. Krishnan Nair - Founding Director of Regional Cancer Centre
- R. Kesavan Nair
- K. P. Haridas - Laparoscopic and Bariatric Surgeon, Awardee of Padma Shri 2015
- A. Marthanda Pillai - neurosurgeon, recipient of 2011 Padma Shri
- P. K. R. Warrier
