= SMV High School, Thiruvananthapuram =

Coordinates: 8.4908°N 76.9469°E

Sree Moola Vilasam Govt: Model Higher Secondary School
- Trivandrum, Kerala; India

Information
- Type: Government School
- Principal: V. Vasanthakumari
- Website: [www.smvhighschool.in]

Sree Moola Vilasam Government Model Higher Secondary School (popularly known as SMV School) is one among the oldest Schools in Kerala, Thiruvananthapuram Established by Travancore Maharaja for English Education.

Sree Moola Vilasom Government Model Higher Secondary School, one of the best Schools in Thiruvananthapuram. This school was built by Tranvancore Maharaja Sree Swathi Thirunal and is one of the oldest school in Kerala Established in 1836. The buildings of the school was once used as the Commissioner Office. The fine architecture of British is one of its kind that provides natural aeration and lighting.

The school has an active National Service Scheme unit which is the best unit in Trivandrum which initiates social activities. The unit has also won the award of the state government for the best NSS unit of the city.

The position of the school near the downtown helps the people from all parts of the city.

In June 2023, the government changed the school from boys-only to mixed.

== Alumni ==
- Dr. N. R. Madhava Menon, Legal educator
- Dr. R. Kesavan Nair, Medical Academic
- M. K. K. Nair, Bureaucrat
- Dr. P. K. Iyengar, Scientist, Padma Bhushan Winner
- Madhu (actor), Veteran Actor in Indian Film Industry
- G. Shankar, Architect
