= College of Nursing, Trivandrum, Kerala =

Educational institution in India

- Type: Government College
- Established: 1972
- Location: Trivandrum, Kerala, India; 8.5241°N 76.9267°E
- Language: English

The College of Nursing, Trivandrum, Kerala, India, founded in 1972, is the pioneer institute for nursing education in Kerala and one of the earliest in South East Asia. It comes under the Directorate of Medical Education, Government of Kerala and is affiliated to the University of Kerala and the Kerala University of Health Sciences.

== History ==
It started as a school of nursing in the 1943, offering diploma courses to students. It was in the year 1963, that it was elevated into a college with bachelor programs, first of its kind in Kerala. Since its establishment, it remained as a department under the Government Medical College Trivandrum. It was only recently that it began to function as a separate autonomous entity under the DME.

== Courses offered ==
The school has been offering post-graduate programmes in nursing since 1987. The college has four areas of PG specialty training: (medical-surgical nursing) 'paediatric nursing, obstetrical and gynaecological nursing and community health nursing. It is the only center in Kerala offering doctoral studies in nursing.

Originally, the number of male students permitted to enroll in the school was restructured to 12.5% of applicants. Presently, the college admits male students with no restriction as to numbers. Previously, students were admitted based on the ranks secured in the All Kerala Medical Entrance Examination, but now the entries are based on marks of the Higher Secondary School Certificates.

The capacity of the undergraduate program was increased from 60 to 75 in 2008.

== Timeline ==
- 1943- Govt. College of Nursing began functioning as school of nursing attached to General Hospital, Thiruvananthapuram.
- 1954-The School of Nursing was shifted to Medical College campus.
- 1960-Diploma programme in Teaching and Administration started with an annual intake of 10 students.
- 1963- School of Nursing was upgraded to College of Nursing with the starting of Post Basic B.Sc (N) for diploma Nurses which was the first of its kind in South East Asia.
- 1972- Four year degree programme in Nursing (B.Sc Nursing) was started with an annual intake of 25 students. The present college building was inaugurated on 12 April 1972 by Dr.K.Balaraman Nair, the then Director of Health Services.
- 1987-Started Post graduate course in nursing (M.Sc Nursing) in Medical and Surgical specialties with an annual intake of four students.
- 1992- BSc Nursing seats were increased from 25 to 50 with 6 seats reserved for boys.
- 1996- Three new M Sc Nursing Specialities (Child Health Nursing, Obstetrics & Gynecological Nursing & Community Health Nursing) were started with 4 students per speciality.
- 1998- Manpower empowerment in Trauma Care in co-operation with Loma Linda University, USA. Male Candidates were admitted to GNM Programme.
- 1999- Started Global Health Exchange Programme in Nursing with Karolinska Institute, Sweden.
- 2002- Increased the number of seats of BSc Nursing to 60. Faculty Exchange Programme under Linnaeus Palme Exchange (LPE) started..
- 2005- College of Nursing was recognized as study center for PhD in Nursing as part of National Consortium, India Nursing Council. MSc Nursing seat increased from 16 to 28.
- 2007- Launched website for College of Nursing, Thiruvananthapuram
- 2008- Increased the BSc Nursing seats to 75. Recognized as Research Center under University of Kerala.
- 2010 -Post Basic BSc. Nursing Programme restarted. BSc. Nursing, Post Basic BSc. Nursing & MSc. Nursing programme were affiliated to Kerala University of Health Sciences (KUHS)
- 2011–One year Post Basic Diploma Programmes started in four specialties, such as Critical Care Nursing, Oncology Nursing, Nurse Midwifery Practitioner and Emergency and Disaster Nursing. A new PG block was inaugurated under the Prime Ministers Swasthya Suraksha Yogana (PMSSY) scheme.
- 2012- Inauguration of the New Block in the campus.
- 2014- A mutual recognition agreement (MRA) was made between Singapore Government and Government of India which recognized this college as an Institution of Higher Learning in Nursing Education along with three more prestigious institutions in India.
- 2015 – Exchange programme in nursing with West Chester University, Pennsylvania, USA commenced.
- 2016- Revised syllabus for BSc Nursing by Kerala University of Health Sciences (KUHS) was implemented. Inaugurated a multipurpose hall and a new conference hall.
