= M. Krishnan Nair =

M. Krishnan Nair may refer to:

- M. Krishnan Nair (author) (1923–2006), Indian Malayalam literary critic and orator
- M. Krishnan Nair (doctor) (1939–2021), Indian oncologist, director of the Regional Cancer Centre in Thiruvananthapuram, Kerala
- M. Krishnan Nair (director) (1926–2001), Indian film director of Malayalam films
- M. Krishnan Nair (politician) (1870–1938), Indian politician, member of Madras Legislative Council

== See also ==
- Kalamandalam Krishnan Nair (1914–1990), Kathakali artist
