= Sree Avittom Thirunal Hospital =

Teaching hospital for women and children in Thiruvananthapuram

Sree Avittom Thirunal Hospital (commonly SAT Hospital) is a public women's and children's teaching hospital in Thiruvananthapuram, Kerala, India. It is one of the principal affiliated hospitals of the Government Medical College, Thiruvananthapuram (GMCT), and provides tertiary maternity, neonatal, pediatric, and reproductive medicine services for the southern districts of Kerala.

== History ==
Plans for a modern teaching hospital in Thiruvananthapuram date to the late 1940s. The Travancore royal family funded the construction of a women's and children's hospital in memory of Prince Sree Avittom Thirunal, whose death prompted the then Maharaja, Chithira Thirunal Balarama Varma, to support a dedicated maternal-and-child facility. The women's and children's hospital was dedicated in 1952 and became a cornerstone of the new medical college established in 1951.

== Campus and location ==
SAT Hospital is situated within the Government Medical College, Thiruvananthapuram campus in the Chalakuzhi–Ulloor area of the city, forming part of a large medical education and care complex alongside the Medical College Hospital, Regional Cancer Centre, Sree Chitra Tirunal Institute for Medical Sciences and Technology, and other institutions.

== Administration and affiliation ==
The hospital is administered by the Directorate of Medical Education, the Government of Kerala, and functions as a teaching unit of Government Medical College, Thiruvananthapuram, which is affiliated with the Kerala University of Health Sciences.

== Clinical departments and services ==
SAT Hospital houses the maternal, neonatal, pediatric and allied subspecialty services of the medical college. As listed by GMCT, services based at SAT include:

- Obstetrics and gynaecology
- Pediatrics and multiple pediatric subspecialties – Neonatology, Pediatric Cardiology, Pediatric Neurology, Pediatric Nephrology, Pediatric Gastroenterology, Pediatric Surgery, Behavioral Pediatrics, Medical Genetics
- Reproductive medicine
- Maternal–fetal medicine

== Programs and centres ==
=== Reproductive medicine ===
The hospital's Department of Reproductive Medicine provides assisted reproductive technology services. As reported in 2025, the program had facilitated the birth of more than 500 babies through in vitro fertilisation (IVF) and related techniques, positioning SAT as a major public-sector fertility centre in the state

=== Rare disease care and Centre of Excellence ===
In January 2023, SAT Hospital was notified as a Centre of Excellence (CoE) for Rare Disease Treatment under India's National Policy for Rare Diseases (NPRD), becoming the 11th such centre nationally.

Kerala subsequently launched the CARE project for rare diseases (2024). By January 2025, state officials reported the initiation of enzyme replacement therapy (ERT) at SAT Hospital in 2024 and said over 100 children were receiving high-cost treatments under the program.

SAT has also been the site of notable rare-disease initiatives in pediatrics, such as providing pre-symptomatic treatment for spinal muscular atrophy (SMA) guided by international protocols, reported as a first in India at the time.

=== Human milk bank ===
In September 2024, Kerala’s third human breast milk bank was inaugurated at SAT Hospital to support nutrition for premature and low-birth-weight infants.

The facility was established in collaboration with the Kerala State Women and Child Development Department and the National Health Mission, aiming to ensure the availability of safe, pasteurized donor human milk for neonates admitted to the hospital’s intensive care units.

== Academics and training ==
As a teaching hospital under GMCT, SAT provides clinical training for MBBS students as well as MD/MS residents in Obstetrics & Gynaecology and Pediatrics, offering 30 MS seats in Obstetrics & Gynaecology and 24 MD seats in Pediatrics. The hospital also hosts super-specialty programs relevant to SAT's services which include DM/MCh in Reproductive Medicine, Pediatric Surgery, Neonatology, Pediatric Neurology, and Pediatric Nephrology.
