= P. K. R. Warrier =

Indian cardiothoracic surgeon (1921–2011)

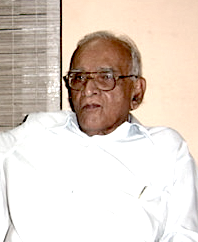
- Born: 13 August 1921; Nellaya, Malabar District, Madras Presidency, British India (present day Palakkad, Kerala, India)
- Died: 26 March 2011 (aged 89); Thiruvananthapuram, Kerala, India
- Occupations: Cardiothoracic surgeon, author, social activist
- Spouse: Devaki Pallam

Pulakkat Krishna Raghava Warrier FRCS (13 August 1921 – 26 March 2011) was an Indian Cardiothoracic surgeon, author and social activist from Kerala.

== Early life ==
P. K. R. Warrier was born on 13 August 1921 to Rao Bahadur Dr. Pulakkat Krishna Warrier and Sreedevi Krishna Warrier in Nellaya, a small village in the Malabar District of the Madras Presidency, British India (present-day Palakkad district, Kerala). He was the youngest son in his family.

He enrolled for medical studies at Madras Medical College during the early 1940s. As a student, he was actively involved in India's freedom struggle. It was during one of the freedom rallies in his student days that he met his future wife, Devaki Pallam, then an apprentice of Gandhi.

== Career ==
After completing the undergraduate education at Madras Medical College in June 1946, Warrier worked as a demonstrator of anatomy between July 1947 and December 1948. He remained in Madras (now Chennai) training as an unofficial house surgeon and senior house surgeon under Dr. Mohan Rao and Dr. C. P. V. Menon at the General Hospital between January 1949 and June 1950. Between June 1950 and August 1959, he worked as a Civil Assistant Surgeon in various government hospitals throughout South India including Coimbatore, Cochin and Trivandrum as well as a brief stint in Minicoy Island.

Warrier then moved to London to attain his Fellowship of the Royal College of Surgeons. After receiving the Fellowship in January 1960, he went on to receive training in cardiothoracic surgery in Stoke-on-Trent and Queen Elizabeth Hospital, Birmingham until 1962.

On returning to India, he joined as an assistant professor to Professor Raghavachari in the Department of Surgery at Trivandrum Medical College 1964. In 1964, Warrer established the Department of Cardio-Thoracic Surgery at the Medical College. He held the position of professor and head of Cardio-Thoracic Surgery when he retired in 1977.

After formal retirement, he continued to work. He was Professor of Surgery at Kasturba Medical College, Manipal until 1983, Chief of Surgery at AKG Memorial Hospital, Kannur until 1986, Surgical Consultant at Aswini Hospital, Thrissur and Semalk Hospital, Ottappalam. In 1990, Warrier retired from all professional work, though he continues to be a prominent presence in the field.

=== Social activism ===
Warrier maintained a close association with E. M. S. Namboodiripad and other prominent Communist leaders of Kerala. He was sympathetic to the early communist movement of Kerala, and was opposed to government-employed doctors performing in private practise. Warrier remained a renowned figure in these circles.

== Personal life ==
Warrier married Devika Pallam, whom he met during the freedom rallies in his student days. His daughter Anasuya Warrier is married to director Shaji N. Karun.

== Books ==
Warrier has published his autobiography in both Malayalam and English. The Malayalam version first appeared as a weekly series in Deshabhimani Weekly. An expanded and rewritten English version of the book titled Experience and Perceptions was later released in 2004.

== Awards received ==
- Abu Dhabi Sakthi-T. K. Ramakrishnan Award (2007)
- Lifetime Achievement Award instituted by the Heart Care Foundation, a charitable society.
- Dubai Art Lovers' Association Award, for his selfless contribution in the field of medicine and surgery.
- Lifetime achievement award of the Dr. K.P. Nair Foundation.
