= Ezhuvanthala =

- village
- Location in Kerala, India Ezhuvanthala (India)
- Coordinates: 10°51′0″N 76°15′0″E
- Country: India
- State: Kerala
- District: Palakkad

Languages
  - Official: Malayalam, English
- Time zone: UTC+5:30 (IST)

Ezhuvanthala is a small village in Nellaya Panchayat of Palakkad district in the state of Kerala in India.
