= Government Medical College, Thiruvananthapuram =

Medical school in Thiruvananthapuram, India

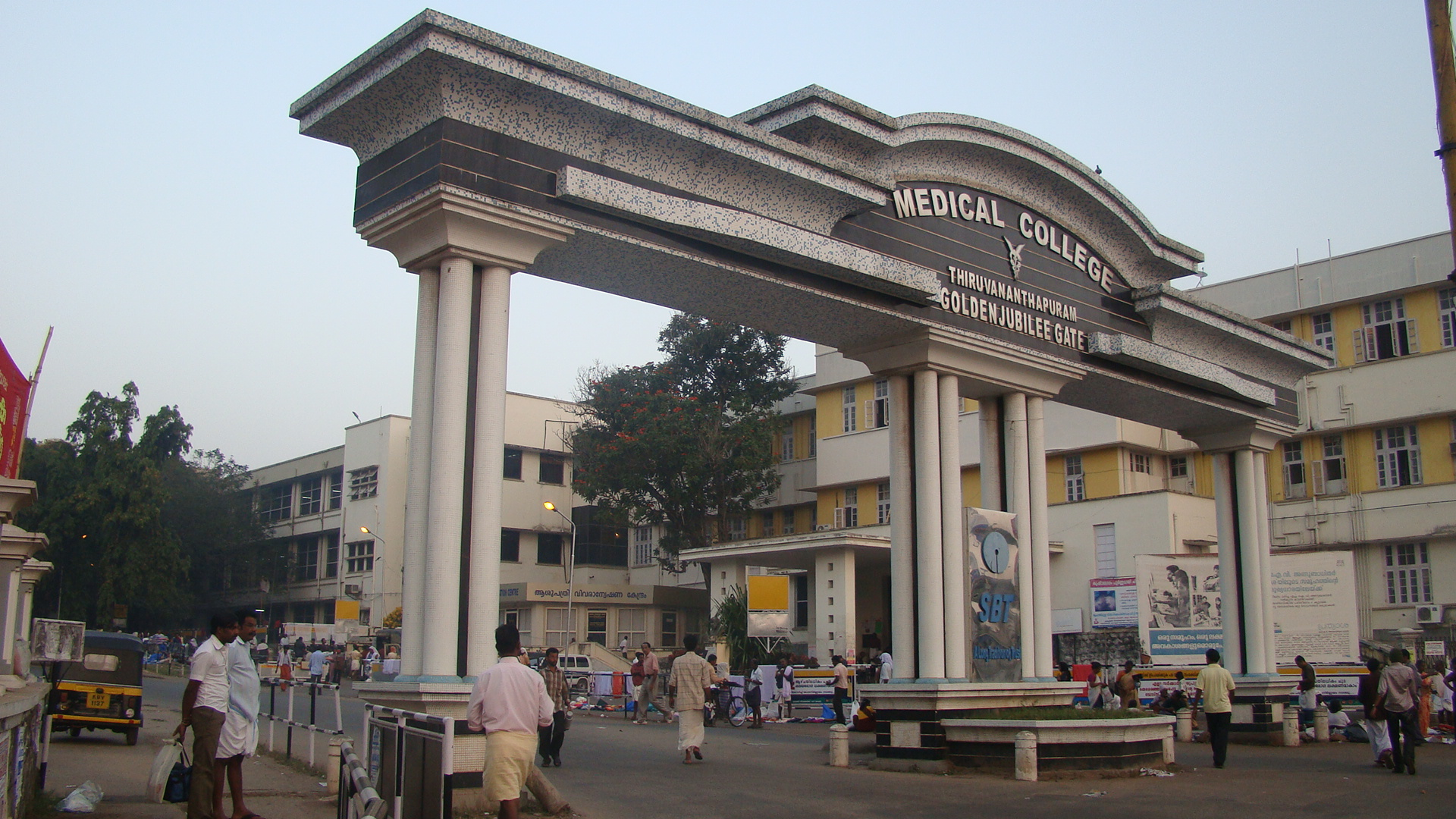
- The college's Golden Jubilee Gate
- Other names: GMCT, TMC
- Type: Government
- Established: 1951; 75 years ago
- Parent institution: Directorate of Medical Education (DME), GoK
- Academic affiliations: Kerala University of Health Sciences
- Principal: Dr. Renju Ravindran
- Location: Thiruvananthapuram, Kerala, India; 8.524°N 76.928°E
- Campus: Urban
- Registration: National Medical Commission
- Administration: Department of Health and Family Welfare, Government of Kerala
- Website: www.tmc.kerala.gov.in

The Government Medical College, Thiruvananthapuram, is a public medical college in Thiruvananthapuram, Kerala, India. Founded in 1951, it was inaugurated by Prime Minister Jawaharlal Nehru and is Kerala's first ever Medical College.

Its campus houses several hospitals and institutions in addition to Medical College Hospital (MCH), including the Colleges of Nursing and Pharmaceutical sciences, the Regional Cancer Centre; an autonomous institution founded jointly by the state and union governments, Thiruvananthapuram Dental College, Sree Chitra Tirunal Institute for Medical Sciences and Technology; another autonomous institute under Govt of India, the Priyadarshini Institute of Paramedical Sciences, the Sree Avittom Thirunal Hospital for Women and Children (SAT Hospital), where the highest number of deliveries are reported in Asia, Child development centre (CDC) an autonomous institution under state government and the Multidisciplinary Research Laboratory (MDRL). The Regional Institute of Ophthalmology (RIO), also a part of the college, is being upgraded to a national-level independent institute.

== Location ==
The college is 7 kilometres (4.3 mi) north of the Thiruvananthapuram Central Railway Station and the KSRTC Central Bus Station. The 232.5 ha (575-acre) campus and hospital campus are west of Dr. C. O. Karunakaran Avenue (formerly the Kumarapuram-Ulloor Road). Across from the hospital is the Chalakuzhi road, which meets the NH544 near Pattom. The college is about 5 kilometres (3.1 mi) from Thiruvananthapuram International Airport.

== History ==
In 1948, the government of Travancore appointed a committee to formulate proposals for a medical college at Thiruvananthapuram. The committee submitted its report and the scheme was sanctioned in October of that year. C. O. Karunakaran was appointed Special Officer for the implementation of the scheme, and was the college's first dean.

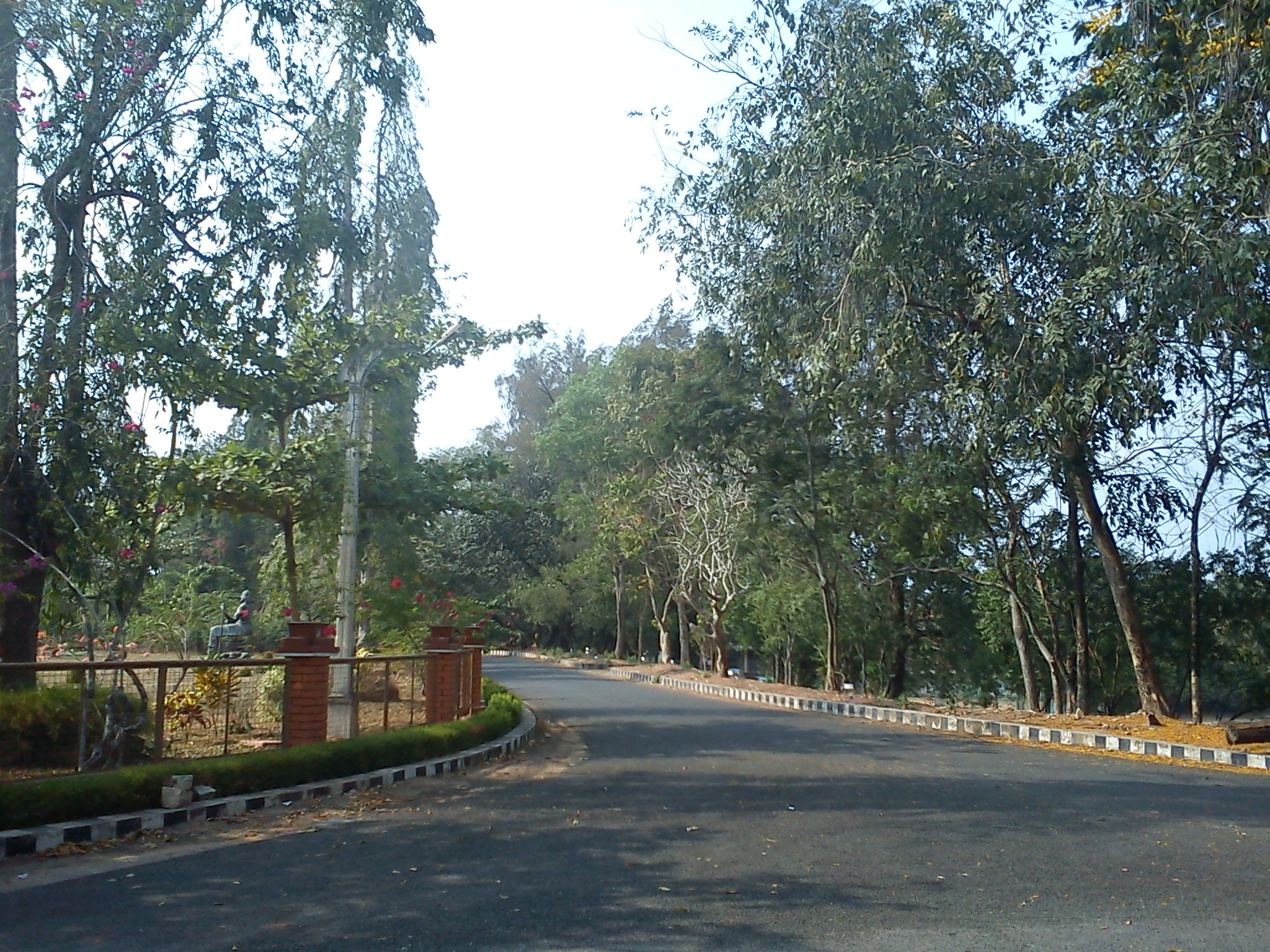
Campus road

The campus was 139 acres (0.56 km^{2}), with hillocks surrounded by evergreen coconut groves and paddy fields and facing the sea, 4 kilometres (2.5 mi) from northwestern Thiruvananthapuram city. Its layout and architectural designs were prepared by J. A. Ritchie of Bombay. The college and hospital buildings were separated by playgrounds for football and hockey, a cricket pitch, courts for tennis, basketball, badminton and volleyball, and a 400-meter track.

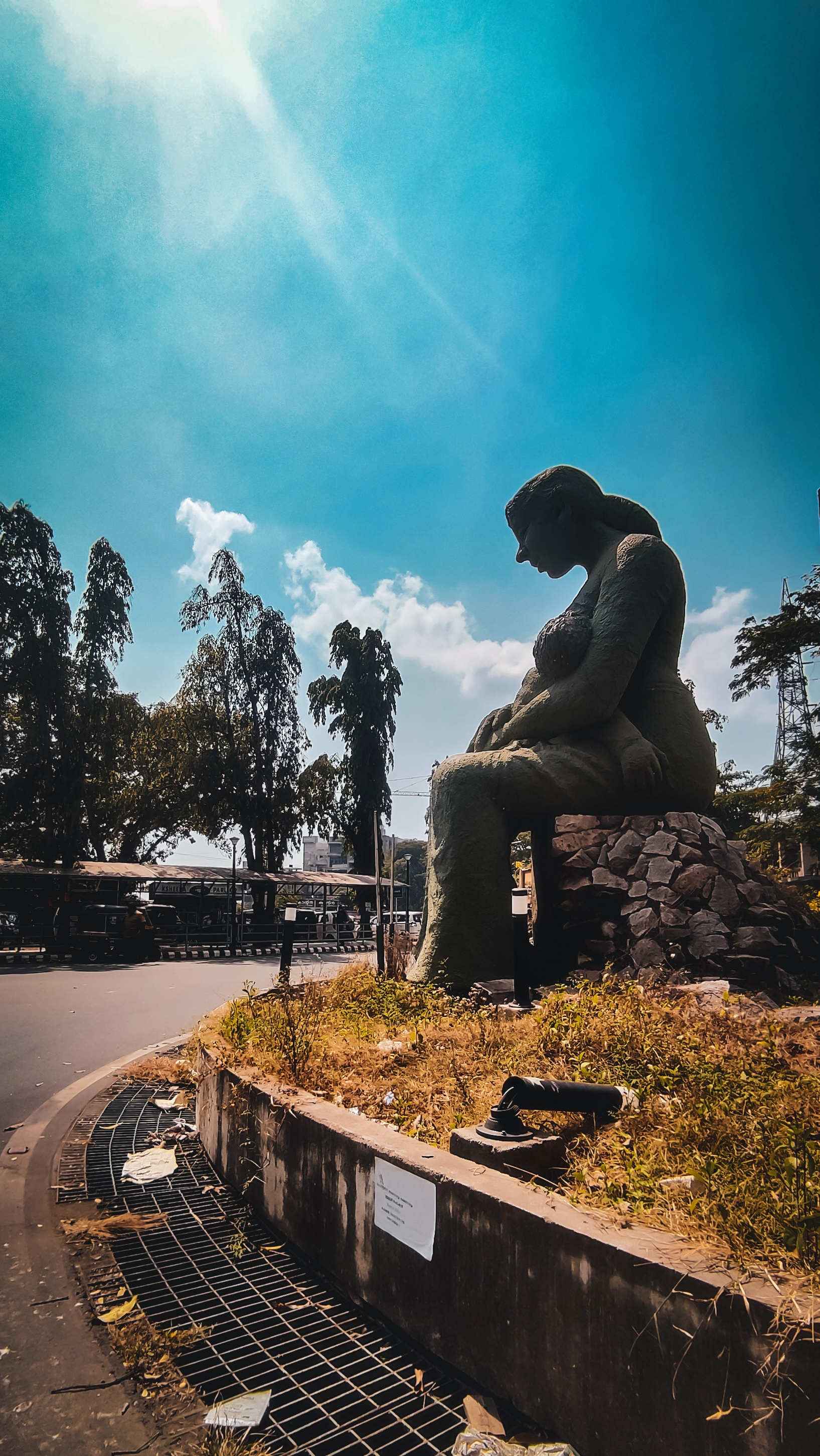
Mother and Baby statue at Medical College Campus

The foundation stone was laid by Raja Pramukh of Travancore–Cochin (Sree Padmanabhadasa Vanchipala Chithira thirunal Balarama Verma) at 11:45 am on 26 January 1950, and the first group of students was admitted in August 1951. The college was dedicated by Jawaharlal Nehru at 8:00 am on 27 November 1951 in the presence of Sree Chithira Thirunal. In January 1952, the Sri. Avittom Thirunal Hospital (SATH) was dedicated by Rajkumari Amrit Kaur. A men's hostel opened in 1952, followed by a women's Hostel one year later. The Medical College Hospital was dedicated by Prime Minister Nehru in 1954.

The School of Nursing was dedicated by Sethu Lakshmi Bai in 1954, and was upgraded to a college of nursing in 1963. The cancer wing was dedicated in 1958; after two decades, the Regional Cancer Centre was founded. The dentistry course and the first post-graduate course began in 1959.

The library was established during the 1960s. The limb center and mental and ophthalmic hospitals were brought into the college. During the 1990s the Regional Institute of Ophthalmology was founded. The Sree Chitra Thirunal Centre, the College of Pharmaceutical Sciences and the Priya Darshini Institute of Paramedical Sciences were established, and the Silver Jubilee Auditorium was built.

=== 1981 to present ===
A specialty block, housing the college's medical and surgical specialties, became operational on 1 July 2010. The block was funded by the prime minister's Swasthya Suraksha Yojna scheme and by the Kerala government. The 253-bed, 160,000-square-foot (15,000 m^{2}) specialty block houses the outpatient clinics and inpatient wards of six specialties, eight operating theatres, six 29-bed intensive-care units and dialysis and kidney-transplant units.

It is financed and administered by the Health and Family welfare Department of the government of Kerala. Although the college was initially affiliated with the University of Kerala, since 2010 it has been affiliated with the Kerala University of Health Sciences.

=== Departments ===
The college began with departments of anatomy, physiology, biochemistry and bacteriology. Dr. C. O. Karunakaran was the first principal of the college. The departments were headed by V. Mathew, C. Vareed, Narayana Rao and C. O. Karunakaran, respectively. The department of bacteriology initially consisted of microbiology, pathology and hygiene. During the Asian flu epidemic, the department was in the forefront of isolating the influenza virus under R. Ananthanarayanan. In 1981, an AIDS surveillance center was established in the department. The Department of Community Medicine, established in 1953, was the first of its kind in India. A primary health centre for field training was established in July 1953 in Cheruvikkal, which was moved to Pangappara in 1964. Intern training was initially conducted at the Indo-Norwegian MCH unit in Neendakara. The department has a regional cell for the prevention of epidemic and infectious diseases. Forensic medicine which was part of community medicine, became a separate entity in 1966 under V. Kanthasamy. Medico-legal autopsies have been performed since 1955, and the department became a state medico-legal institute in 1986. The department of pharmacology later established an experimental pharmacology wing.

The clinical departments of medicine and surgery and the college hospital were established in 1952. Students were initially trained at the general hospital in Thiruvananthapuram. A department of infectious diseases was established in 1983. R. Kesavan Nair, chief surgeon at the general hospital, was appointed professor of surgery and the department of surgery was established. Recognizing the importance of the new specialty of orthopedic surgery, the government of Travancore sent K. I. George of the health services department to the UK for advanced training. George joined the college in 1956, and founded Kerala's first department of orthopedics.

The department of pediatrics, initially under general medicine, has the highest number of patients in Kerala. The obstetrics and gynecology department began in 1954 and was later added to the family-planning clinic contraception testing unit, the WHO training center and the infertility clinic. The department of physical medicine and rehabilitation, established in 1968, pioneered disability management and the treatment of occupational diseases in India.

Specialty departments were established in 1965 with neurosurgery under M. Sambasivan, former president of the World Federation of Neurosurgical Societies. The department of cardiology was established in 1972, and nephrology in 1981. Medical and surgical gastroenterology units were established in 1972 and 1975, respectively.

== Institutions and units ==
=== Medical college ===
In addition to an MBBS programme, postgraduate degree and diploma courses in 22 specialties are offered.

=== Medical College Hospital ===
The Medical College Hospital provides comprehensive health care. It is the largest multi-specialty hospital in South Kerala, serving most of the Thiruvananthapuram and Kollam districts and adjacent districts in Tamil Nadu. The hospital includes a main hospital block, trauma care and an outpatient department. The 1,950-bed hospital admits 80,000 patients a year and provides over 7,500,000 outpatient consultations. The outpatient block houses outpatient wings of medical and surgical specialties, a pharmacy and resident and graduate housing. The hospital averages 55 major and 125 minor operations and 35 vaginal deliveries and 15 caesarean sections per day. Bed occupancy is 90 to 95 percent throughout the year. The new multi-speciality block of medical college hospital will be inaugurated soon to provide better treatment facilities.

The hospital's trauma care and burn unit is recognized by WHO and AIIMS as part of the National Programme for Prevention and Management of Injuries and Burns (NPPMT&BI), among 8 other hospital like AIIMS and JIPMER in India. It also hosts a dedicated comprehensive stroke clinic, the highest specialization offered.

=== Regional Institute of Ophthalmology ===
About 4 kilometres (2.5 mi) from the main campus, the Regional Institute of Ophthalmology is near the general hospital in Thiruvananthapuram. It originated as a government ophthalmic hospital in 1905, and was brought into the National Programme for Control of Blindness in 1995. The RIO is directed by Dr Sahasranamam V. Postgraduate courses in ophthalmology are offered, and a bachelor's-degree course in optometry is available with an annual intake of 20 students. A BSc. Optometry course began in 2010.

RIO is India's second government institute offering a bachelor's degree in optometry. It hosts an optical outlet (in collaboration with HLL Life Care) and a dispensing facility. Specialized services including retina, paediatric ophthalmology, low vision, cornea and glaucoma clinics, an eye bank, tele-ophthalmology, a uvea clinic, a dispensing lab and contact-lens and cataract clinics. Kerala's first mobile eye hospital, Sunayanam, operates from the RIO.

=== School of Optometry ===
The School of Optometry is on the RIO campus. A Bachelor of Science (Honours) degree in optometry is affiliated with Kerala University of Health Sciences. GMC Thiruvananthapuram is India's second government institute offering a four-year professional degree course in optometry; the first is All India Institute of Medical Sciences, Delhi.

=== Health units ===
The first health unit was established in Neendakara as an Indo-Norwegian collaboration. A primary health centre, founded in July 1953 in Cheruvikkal for field practice, was moved to Pangappara in 1964. Rural health centers for student and intern field practice are in Pangappara and Vakkom.

=== Sree Avittom Thirunal Hospital ===
The women's and children's hospital was dedicated in 1952. It was built by the Travancore royal family in memory of Prince Sree Avittom Thirunal, who died at age eight years of rheumatic heart disease. The hospital houses the departments of obstetrics and gynecology and pediatrics. The OB-GYN department administers the postpartum, family-welfare counseling, infertility, trophoblastic, adolescent and vesicular-mole clinics and WHO and Indian Council of Medical Research collaborative study centers. The hospital also provides pediatric care in cardiology, neurology, nephrology, genetics, surgery and psychiatry, and has one of Asia's highest delivery rates.

=== Specialty block ===
The specialty block, dedicated in 2011, houses the nephrology, urology, neurology, neurosurgery and medical and surgical gastroenterology departments and their out- and inpatient wings, and has 40 ICU beds, 25 high-care beds and six modular operating theaters. Cadaver organ retrieval and transplant began in 2012, making it the first government hospital to offer the service on a wide scale.

=== Child-development centre ===
The Child Development Centre was established by the government of Kerala for early-child and adolescent care and education, premarital counselling, women's welfare and related fields. It has contributed to reducing childhood disabilities and developed the Thiruvananthapuram Development Chart, used to assess child development in community settings.

=== Mental Health Center ===
The Mental Health Center in Oolampara is administered by the college. With more than 150 patients, it is India's second-largest mental health center. In addition to treatment facilities, a rehabilitation center has been established with the aid of Hindustan Latex Limited.

=== Chest Diseases Hospital ===
The former government tuberculosis sanatorium in Pulayanarkottah is now part of the department of respiratory medicine, which is housed here (except for the outpatient department and intensive-care unit, which are at the college). The sanatorium has been renamed the Chest Diseases Hospital.

=== Dental college ===
Thiruvananthapuram Dental College was founded in 1959, one of four dental colleges in India's four southern states. M. Thangavelu, dean of the medical college, was instrumental in organizing the institution. A. M. Clement, a dental surgeon at the medical college, was appointed its first director. The college admits 50 students a year for its BDS course. Postgraduate courses began in 1966. The college has six departments under director N. O. Varghese.

=== College of Pharmaceutical Sciences ===
Established in 1967, Kerala's first pharmaceutical college offers bachelor's and master's degrees and a diploma in pharmaceutical sciences. The college includes departments of pharmacology, pharmaceutics, pharmacognosy, pharmaceutical chemistry and pharmaceutical microbiology. Other facilities are toxicology and animal labs, a drug-information center, morphine-tablet manufacturing and a medicinal

=== College of Nursing ===
The college, founded in 1972, is affiliated with the University of Kerala medical school. It has offered postgraduate programmes in nursing since 1987. The college has five areas of speciality training: mental-health nursing, medical-surgical nursing, pediatric nursing, obstetrical and gynaecological nursing and community-health nursing. Although the number of male students permitted to enroll in the school was originally restricted to 12.5 percent of applicants, the restriction has been removed. A specialised nursing wing opened in 2011.

=== Physical Medicine and Rehabilitation (PM&R) Department ===
The PM&R department is located about 100 metres from the medical college main gate on the Medical College junction - Kumarapuram road adjacent to medical college post office. The department offers both out patient (OP) and in patient (IP) rehabilitation. Neurological, Musculoskeletal and Rheumatological cases across pediatric to geriatric age groups form the bulk of cases attending here. The department offers comprehensive rehabilitation services including physiatry, rehab nursing, physiotherapy, occupational therapy, orthotics, prosthetics, social rehab etc. The department conducts specific clinics for cerebral palsy, sports injury, obesity, stroke and also weekly outreach clinic at Pangappara Medical College unit. Also it provides 3 year post graduation course in PM&R (MD PM&R) for qualified MBBS graduates.

The rehabilitation team at the department consists of physiatrists, rehab nurses, physiotherapists, occupational therapists, orthotists and prosthetists, social workers, rehab coordinator, engineers, office staff etc. It is headed by physiatrists who conduct the daily OP clinics and also attend to the ward patients as well as OP/IP consultations from other departments. Each patient is seen by the physiatrist who conducts a thorough clinical evaluation and focusses on the felt needs and functional status of the patient. The various ways in which the disease has affected the ability to do various activities and participate in social roles is noted. The rehab issues are identified and listed according to priority. Also, the general medical issues/co-morbidities and complications that have occurred as a result of the disease are analysed. Relevant blood and radiological investigations are sent for. The investigative facilities available at the department includes urodynamics, instrumented gait analysis, electrodiagnostics (nerve conduction study, electromyogram), musculoskeletal ultrasonography, pulmonary function tests etc. which are performed by the physiatrists as relevant to the case. Based on the assessment the physiatrist gets an idea about the disease process and potential for further recovery. The physiatrist draws up a rehabilitation program to address the felt needs of the patient and ultimately to improve the functional status to maximum possible extent. Appropriate rehab goals are set which may be immediate, short term and long term. The physiatrist uses medications, exercises, semi invasive interventions and surgeries to improve the quality of life of the patient. Also assistive technology prescriptions are given to the patient. This may be assistive aids, ambulatory aids (canes, crutches, walker), wheelchairs, orthotics, prosthetics etc. Also for the in-patients, the physiatrist looks after the general medical issues/co-morbidities like diabetes, hypertension as well as the specific complications encountered in rehabilitation period like pain, pressure sore, DVT, spasticity, contractures, nutritional issues (anemia, hypoproteinemia etc). Semi invasive interventions done here include prolotherapy with dextrose, platelet rich plasma (PRP), joint infiltration, spinal injection, nerve blocks, botulinum toxin injection, phenol chemodenervation etc. Plaster of Paris procedures like serial casting, total contact casting, splint preparation are done here. The physiatrists also do surgeries for deformity correction in conditions like cerebral palsy, meningomyelocele, stroke, CTEV, congenital limb deficiency, traumatic brain injury and also surgeries for conditions like carpal tunnel syndrome, Dequervain tenosynovitis, trigger finger, pressure injury.

=== Central Library ===
The library, housed in the administrative wing, contains books and academic journals relating to medicine and its allied sciences. Its Learning Resource Center (LRC), established by the college's alumni association, has internet-enabled computers for paid use and subscribes to online medical journals

=== Multidisciplinary Research Laboratory (MDRL) and Animal house ===
A state of the art platform for motivating medical fraternity and students in multidisciplinary research activities. The center consists of Multidisciplinary research unit (MRU- ICMR), Viral research and diagnostic lab(VRDL-ICMR), Physiology research lab and multichannel data acquisition system, Lecture halls and auditorium. Zebra fish research facility has the fully automated systems, the first installation in Kerala. COVID-19 diagnostic lab is currently functioning here.

== Academics ==
Courses offered by the college are:

- M.B.B.S. (annual intake 250 students)
- M.D.-M.S. (annual intake about 160 students in 23 disciplines)
- D.M.-M.Ch. (18 seats in four and six disciplines, respectively)
- BSc (Hons.) in Optometry (annual intake 20 students)
- Bachelor of Pharmacy (annual intake 60 students)
- BSc (Hons.) in Nursing (annual intake 60 students)
- BSc (Hons.) in Medical Lab Technology (annual intake 28 students)
- BSc in Perfusion Technology (annual intake four students)
- BSc in Cardiovascular Technology (annual intake five students)
- BSc in Nursing (post-certificate)
- MSc in Nursing (annual intake 28 students)
- Master of Pharmacy (annual intake 26 students in Five branches)
- Master of Science in Medical Laboratory Technology (annual intake 12 students)
- Master of Science in Medical Physics and Epidemiology (16 seats)
- M.Phil in Clinical Epidemiology (10 seats)
- CENTRAL STERILE SUPPLY TECHNOLOGY- DCSST (2 year diploma course under DME kerala

(annual intake 5 students)

- Diploma in Medical Laboratory Technology (40 seats in the college)
- Diploma in Radiological Technology (10 seats in the college)
- Diploma in Dialysis Technology (annual intake six students)
- Diploma in General Nursing and Midwifery (annual intake 30 students)
- Diploma in Clinical Child Development (annual intake 12 students)
- Diploma in Pharmacy (20 seats in the college)
- Dental Mechanics Certificate Course (annual intake six students)
- Diploma in Operation Theatre and Anaesthesia Technology (annual intake 15 students)
- Diploma in Endoscopy Technology (annual intake four students)
- Diploma in Neurotechnology
- Diploma in Optometry

== Timeline ==
- 1905 – Ophthalmic hospital opened
- 1950 – Medical-college foundation stone laid
- 1951 – First batch of MBBS students admitted
- 1952 – Opening of SAT Hospital and men's hostel
- 1954 – Opening of 450-bed medical-college hospital
- 1958 – Cancer wing opened
- 1959 – Dental college opened with BDS course, first postgraduate course, nurses hostel
- 1964 – Artificial Limb Centre opened
- 1967 – B Pharm course, comprehensive rehabilitation research and training project began
- 1970 – Mental and ophthalmic hospitals join the college
- 1972 – BScN course, SCTMC, Department of Physical Medicine and Rehabilitation commissioned
- 1973 – New nursing-college wing
- 1975 – College of Pharmaceutical Sciences opened, foundation stone for the Regional Limb Fitting Centre laid
- 1976 – Teacher-training programme began
- 1978 – New Regional Limb Fitting Centre building
- 1995 – Clinical Epidemiology Resource and Training Center
- 1996 – Dr. C.O. Karunakaran Auditorium opened
- 2002 – Learning Resource Centre (LRC)
- 2010 – BSc Optometry course (India's second government optometry school)
- 2011 – Specialty and outpatient wings
- 2011 – MSc in Medical Laboratory Technology course, specializing in pathology, microbiology or biochemistry
- 2012 – First cadaver organ transplant in a Kerala government hospital
- 2013 – First test-tube baby in a South Indian government hospital
- 2015 – Skywalk connecting new outpatient and ward wings
- 2018 – New multispecialty block (MSB) with state of the art Trauma Care ICU, Geriatric Dept and Ward, Critical care ICU, Cardiology ICU

== Achievements ==
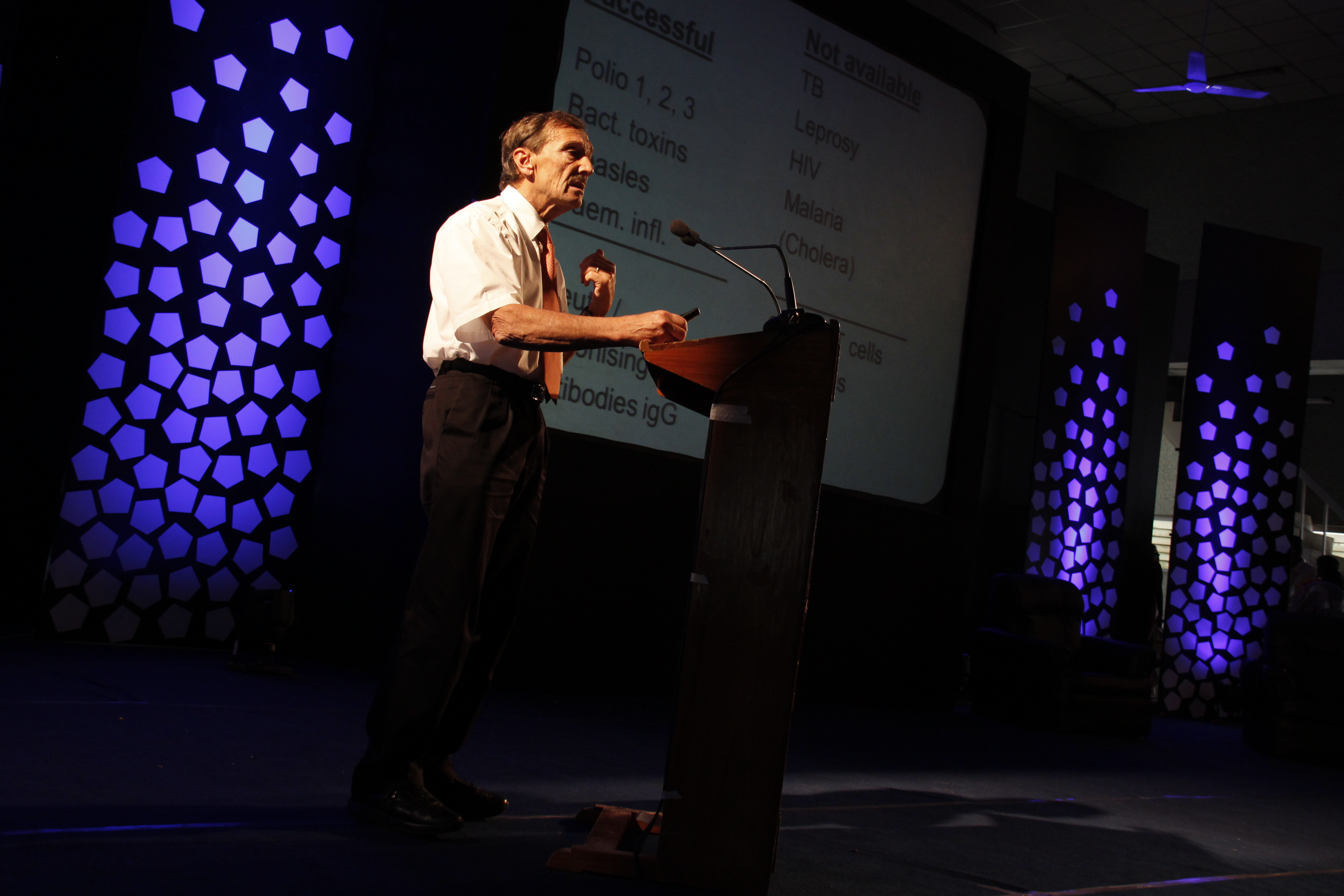
Nobel laureate Rolf M. Zinkernagel speaking at the 2011 Erudite Conclave

The college follows the Kerala model of health care. The state has maintained health indices at par with developed nations, well above the national averages. This has been studied by a number of agencies for use in other states of India and developing nations. During the 1950s Asian flu pandemic, it was the principal institute to isolate and research the virus. It was ranked 21st in an India Today survey. The college has a good clinical record and in 2024, the college was ranked 42nd among medical college in India by National Institutional Ranking Framework (NIRF).

University rankings

Medical – India
- NIRF (2024): 42

SAT Mix, developed by doctors and nutritionists at SAT Hospital, is used throughout India to manage childhood malnutrition and is a cost-effective measure to reduce infant mortality. The Thiruvananthapuram Development Chart, a scale to assess child development, was developed by the Child Development Center and is recommended for community developmental assessment. The college is one of 15 across India to be connected through the National Knowledge Commission's National Knowledge Network to integrate its knowledge base with the global scientific community.

== Erudite Conclave ==
The college conducted an international Erudite Conclave, the region's first, in November 2011 to provide momentum to medical research. Speakers included Nobel laureate in medicine Rolf M. Zinkernagel, ophthalmologist and inventor of inexpensive intraocular lenses Sanduk Ruit, and SRISTI and techpedia.in founder Anil Kumar Gupta. The second conclave, in 2012, was attended by R. Basant, Padmasree Dr. G. Vijayaraghavan, S. Murti (Indian Institute of Science Education and Research, Thiruvananthapuram), R. V. G. Menon and former Indian ambassador T. P. Sreenivasan.

== Student life and activities ==
The number of male and female students in the college is almost equal. In addition to Kerala, students from Lakshadweep, Northeast India and other parts of the country are admitted by recommendation and under the All India quota. The college hosts exchange students from the Karolinska Institute and other public-health and medical schools. Visitors have included Alexander Fleming, E. Lundsgaard, Karl Evang, Julian Huxley, Wharton Young, Jean Aicardi, David Morley and A. Lakshmana Swamy Mudaliar.

=== College union ===
The college union was dedicated in 1952 by Alexander Fleming. Since it is in the state capital, it has been politicized and depoliticized. In accordance with Lyngdoh Committee recommendations, each incoming class selects a representative to the student council, which in turn selects the union office-bearers.

=== Events ===
Athletic Association Day and the college-union inauguration are major campus events. The college has hosted the Kerala University Youth Festival and the Intermedicos Festival several times. Medex public exhibitions were organised in 1974 (as a part of the college's silver-jubilee celebration), 2000, 2001, 2012 and 2017. Annual cultural events (organised by the classes) and sports and games competitions are held on campus. Academic programs include the Erudite Conclave and the Student Medical Research Conference. Intermedicos Genesis 14 was held at the school on 2–8 December 2014. During the annual Interbatch Euphoria, students from different batches compete in the fields of arts, cultural activities, quizzes and sports.

=== Graduation ===
The medical, dental, optometry and nursing colleges organize separate graduation ceremonies. There are no separate graduation ceremonies after postgraduate courses.

== Notable alumni and faculty ==
- C. O. Karunakaran, Special Officer and the first Principal of the Medical College, often referred to as the father of Medical College, Trivandrum. A Rockfeller Foundation Scholarship recipient, he developed smallpox and rabies vaccine indigenously in the Public Health Laboratory of Thiruvananthapuram.
- R. Kesavan Nair, Kerala's first civil surgeon and FRCS, one of the founding fathers of Thiruvananthapuram Medical College, was also its first Superintendent.
- K. V. Krishna Das, Best outgoing student of first batch with four gold medals, former Director & Professor of Medicine, Chief-Editor of many textbooks and a farmer & philanthropist. A recipient of the lifetime achievement awards of Government of Kerala, Association of Physicians of India and Indian Society of Hematology & Blood Transfusion. Served as Member Governing Board AIIMS, Overseas Counselor Royal College of Physicians UK and Council Member NAMS. Research areas include iron-deficiency Anemia, neoplasms of blood and infectious diseases. One among the expert committee which published public health policy and drug formulary of Kerala. Five of his students have been honored with Padma Shri.
- M. S. Valiathan, former director of Sree Chitra Tirunal Institute for Medical Sciences and Technology and vice-chancellor of Manipal University in Karnataka. A recipient of the Padma Bhushan and the Indian National Science Academy's Shree Dhanwantari Prize, the cardio-thoracic surgeon has published a number of papers on endomyocardial fibrosis.
- Axel Höjer, the college's second dean, was a Swedish physician from the Karolinska Institute and director-general of the Swedish Medical Board. He revolutionised community medicine in Europe with education on maternal assistance, infant disease control and sexual-hygiene courses.
- Jimmy George, Indian volleyball player and a medical student, helped the University of Kerala win the Inter-University Championships from 1973 to 1976. George later joined the Kerala Police.
- A. Marthanda Pillai, former H.O.D of the Department of Neurosurgery, recipient of Padma Shri in 2011 and founder, managing director of Ananthapuri Hospitals and Research Institute.
- M. Krishnan Nair, oncologist and founding member of the Regional Cancer Centre, Thiruvananthapuram, is the only Indian member of the World Health Organization's Advisory Committee of the Director General and Cancer Technical Group (CTG).
- P. K. R. Warrier, Cardio-thoracic surgeon established the college's department of cardio-thoracic surgery in 1964.
- M. R. Rajagopal, a palliative care physician and founder chairman of Pallium India, is a recipient of Padma Shree and is regarded as the father of palliative care in India.
- G. Vijayaraghavan, Cardiologist recipient of the Padma Shri, is the founding director of the Kerala Institute of Medical Sciences and popularized 2D echocardiography in India during the 1980s.
- B. Ekbal, former Vice Chancellor, University of Kerala (2000–2004)
- K. S. Manoj, member of the Lok Sabha from Alappuzha.
- K. N. Raghavan, Former international cricket umpire and former First Secretary of the Indian High Commission at Singapore, is a civil servant at the Indian Revenue Service.
- M. Subhadra Nair, Former head of the college's department of obstetrics and gynecology who received the Padma Shri in 2014.
- Sajeev Koshy, Specialist Endodontist and recipient of the Australian Honours in 2016 and former Federal Secretary of Australian and New Zealand Academy of Endodontists.
- Sriram Venkitaraman, IAS

== Controversy ==
On June 15, 2024, a 59-year-old man named Ravindran Nair was rescued after being trapped for two days in a lift at the Government Medical College Hospital in Thiruvananthapuram. He had entered the lift for a medical check-up and got stuck when it malfunctioned. Despite pressing the alarm and trying emergency numbers, no one responded until a lift operator discovered him during routine work on Monday. Following the incident, three hospital staff members were suspended for their lapses.

== See also ==
- List of medical colleges in India
- Jawaharlal Institute of Postgraduate Medical Education and Research
- Postgraduate Institute of Medical Education and Research
- Government T D Medical College, Alappuzha
- Christian Medical College & Hospital
- Government Medical College, Thrissur
