= University of Kerala =

University in India

- Malayalam: കേരള സർവകലാശാല
- Emblem of the University of Kerala
- Other name: Kerala University
- Former name: University of Travancore
- Motto: Karmaṇi Vyajyate Prajñā (കർമണി വ്യജ്യതേ പ്രജ്ഞാ) (Sanskrit)
- Motto in English: Wisdom manifests itself in action
- Type: Public research university
- Established: 1 November 1937; 89 years ago
- Founder: Chithira Thirunal Balarama Varma
- Accreditation: NAAC, NBA, UGC
- Affiliations: NIRF
- Academic affiliations: ACU, AICTE, AIU, AUAP, BCI, CCIM, COA, ICAR, INC, NCTE, PCI, WES
- Budget: ₹8.1 billion (US$87 million)
- Chancellor: Governor of Kerala
- Vice-Chancellor: Prof.(Dr.) Mohanan Kunnummal (acting)
- Pro-Chancellor: Roji M. John (Minister for Higher Education)
- Students: 40000+
- Undergraduates: 35000+
- Postgraduates: 6000+
- Doctoral students: 250+
- Other students: 1000+
- Location: Thiruvananthapuram, Kerala, India 8°30′12″N 76°56′50″E
- Campus: Urban
- Language: English, Malayalam, Hindi
- Sporting affiliations: NCC, NSS
- Website: keralauniversity.ac.in

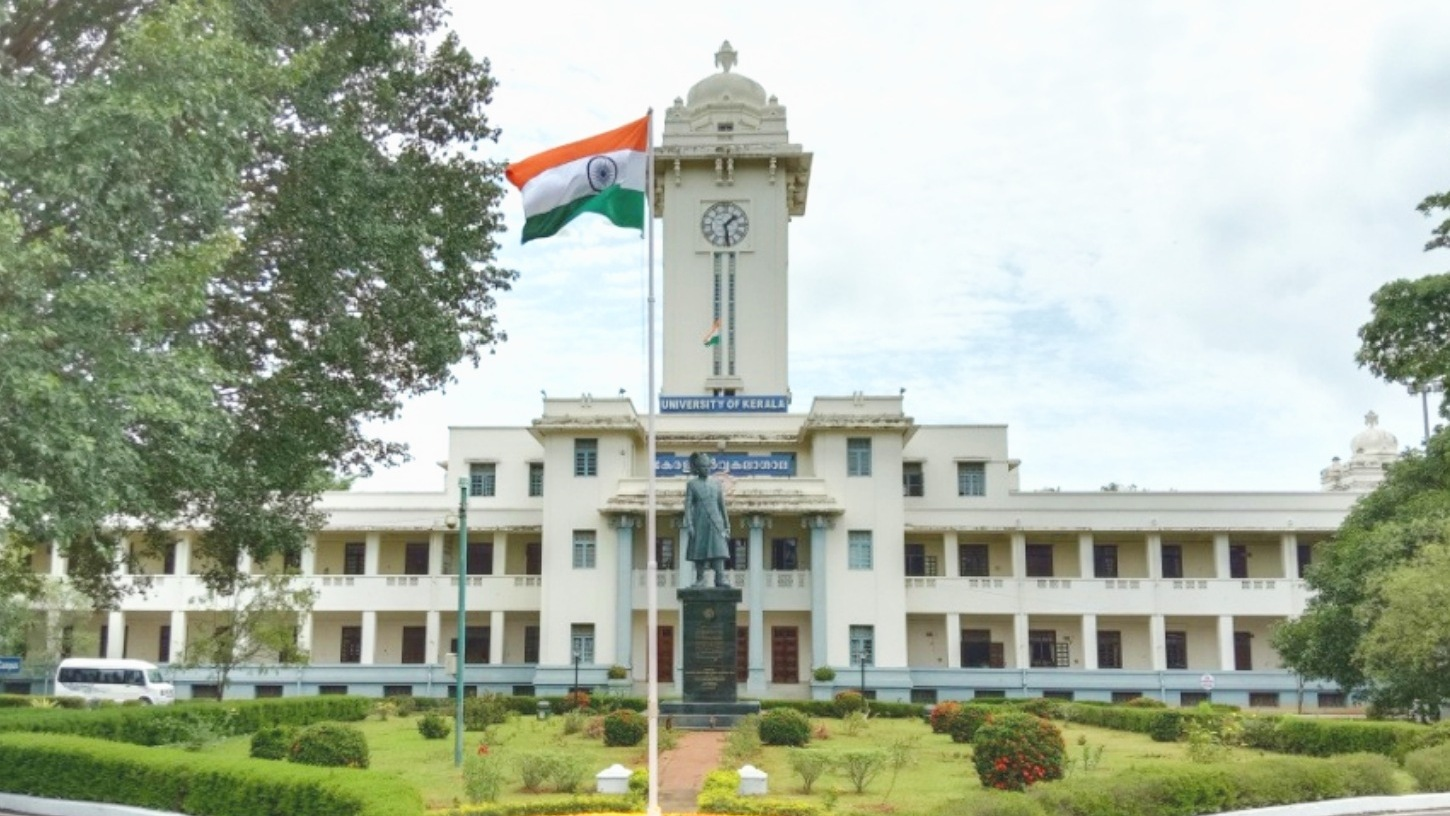
Senate House, University of Kerala.

University of Kerala, commonly referred to as Kerala University (KU, ISO: Kēraḷa Sarvakālāśāla) and formerly known as University of Travancore, is a public state university in Thiruvananthapuram, the capital of Kerala, India. It was established in 1937 by a promulgation of the Maharajah of Travancore, Chithira Thirunal Balarama Varma who was also the first Chancellor of the university. C. P. Ramaswamy Iyer, the then Diwan (Prime Minister) of the State was the first Vice-Chancellor. It was the first university in Kerala, and among the first in the country. It is accredited by NAAC with highest grade of 'A++' and scored 3.67 points out of 4.

The university has over 150 affiliated colleges and has sixteen faculties and 43 Departments of teaching and research. The Governor of Kerala serves as the Chancellor of university.

== History ==
The history of the University of Kerala is integral to the history of the state itself. One of the first 16 universities in India, the University of Kerala was founded on 1 November 1937, as the University of Travancore in the erstwhile princely state of Travancore (now southern part of Kerala and some neighbouring parts of state of Tamil Nadu).

The university came into being by a promulgation of the Maharajah of Travancore, Sri Chithira Thirunal Balarama Varma who was also the first Chancellor of the university. Sir C. P Ramaswamy Ayyar, the then Diwan (Prime minister) of the State was the first Vice-Chancellor. He was an eminent scholar and an able administrator. It has been written in Indian media that the Government made an unsuccessful attempt to invite Albert Einstein to be the first Vice-Chancellor. The university was modeled after the best Universities of the United Kingdom, and even today retains some of these features. The affiliating system of the university, however, evolved differently from the college system in British universities.

The earliest origins of the university may be traced back to two institutions of modern learning in Kerala – the University College Thiruvananthapuram and the Trivandrum Observatory. The University College was initially founded as the Maharaja's Free School by Maharaja Swathi Thirunal in 1834, with Mr John Roberts, a Christian Missionary as Headmaster, and soon grew into a college in 1866, affiliated to the Madras University. When the University of Travancore was founded, the departments of the college became University departments, only to switch back again when the transformation to University of Kerala happened in 1957. The University College still retains its connection with the university as an affiliated college. The Thiruvananthapuram Observatory was founded in 1838 and had an internationally reputed scientist, John Caldecott FRS as its first Director. It became a part of the Travancore University, but was administered as an independent government institution for some time. It is now the oldest institution under the Kerala University.

== Organisation and administration ==
=== Governance ===
The Chancellor, the Pro-Chancellor, the Vice- Chancellor, the Pro-Vice-Chancellor, and the members of the Senate, the Syndicate and the Academic Council constitutes the governing body of the university. The Governor of Kerala is the Chancellor of the university while Education Minister of Kerala is the Pro-Chancellor of the university.

== Rankings ==
University rankings
General – India
NIRF (Overall) (2025)	42
NIRF (Universities) (2025)	25
NIRF (State Public Universities) (2025)	5

Ranked 25th among universities, 5th among public state universities and 42nd overall by the National Institutional Ranking Framework (NIRF) in 2025. The QS World University Rankings ranked the university 339th in Asia in 2025.

== International Students ==
The University of Kerala has received an unprecedented 2,620 applications from international students representing 81 countries for its academic programmes in 2025–26.The university currently hosts 205 international students from 52 countries, including Colombia, Peru, United Kingdom, and the United States of America, through ICCR scholarships and self-financing options.

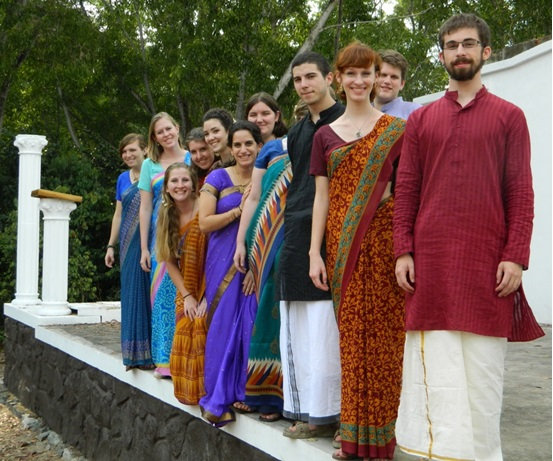
Students from America at Kerala University's Kariavattom campus, Thiruvananthapuram.

=== Semester-in-India Programme (SIP) ===
The University of Kerala runs a Semester-in-India Programme (SIP) for American students, enabling them to study selected courses for one semester with credit transfer to their home institutions. The programme is governed by the university's Credit Transfer Regulations and Credit and Semester System (CSS) Regulations for foreign students. So far, three batches with a total of 23 students have completed the SIP, representing institutions such as St. Mary's College of Maryland, Grand Valley State University, George Mason University, Green Mountain College, Cornell University, Plymouth State University, Hendrix College, Berea College and Pacific University.

== Academic collaborations with foreign universities ==
The University of Kerala has signed MoUs (Memorandum of Understanding) with up to 22 institutions across the globe. It includes University of Hartford, University of Warsaw, Yaroslav-the-Wise Novgorod State University.

== Notable alumni ==
Notable alumni includes tenth President of India K. R. Narayanan, renowned theoretical physicist Thanu Padmanabhan, geneticist M. S. Swaminathan, ISRO former chairman G. Madhavan Nair, INSA scientist Perdur Radhakantha Adiga, former Supreme Court judges, Justice Kurian Joseph, Justice Fathima Beevi, legal luminary N. R. Madhava Menon, Indian film actor Mohanlal, Malayalam poets O. N. V. Kurup, Sugathakumari, Music composer G. Devarajan, historian M. G. S. Narayanan, cricketer Sanju Samson and many other eminent personalities.

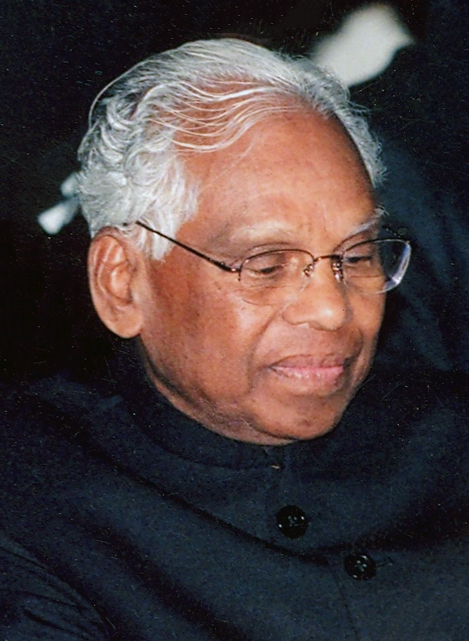
10th President of India, K. R. Narayanan

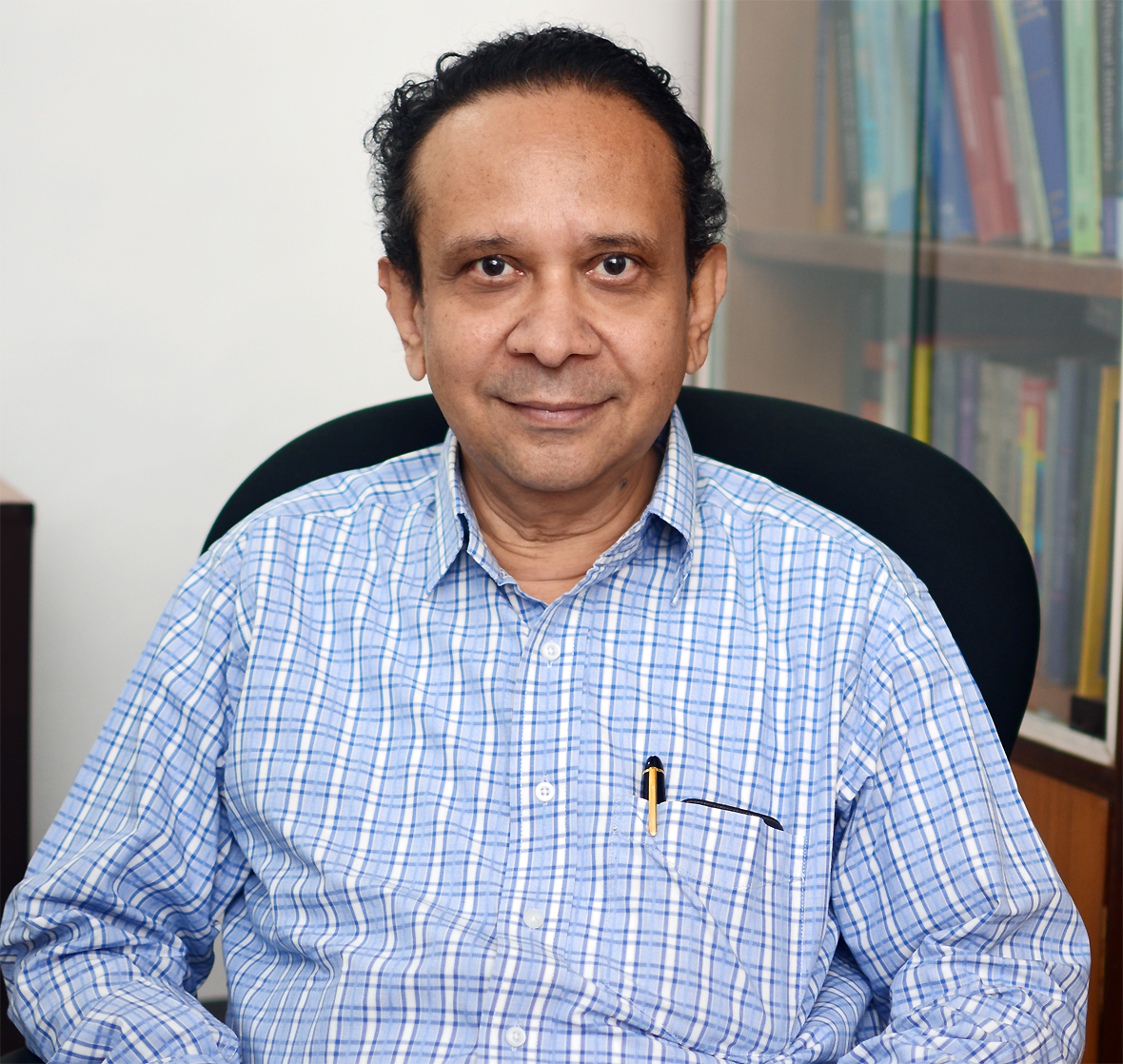
ProfessorThanu Padmanabhan

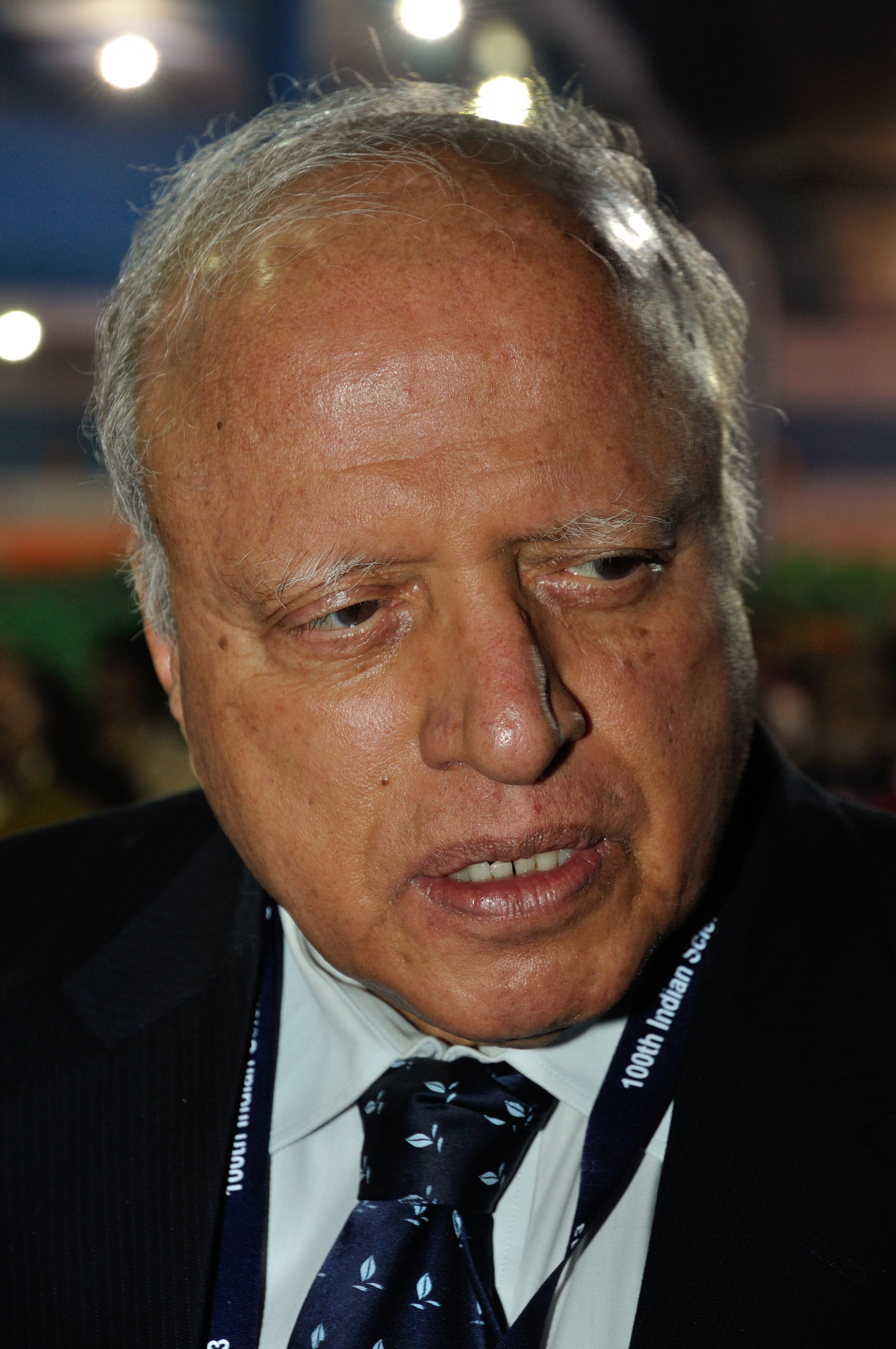
Father of Green Revolution, Recipient of Bharat Ratna, M. S. Swaminathan

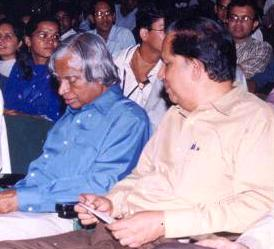
ISRO Chairman G. Madhavan Nair with A. P. J. Abdul Kalam

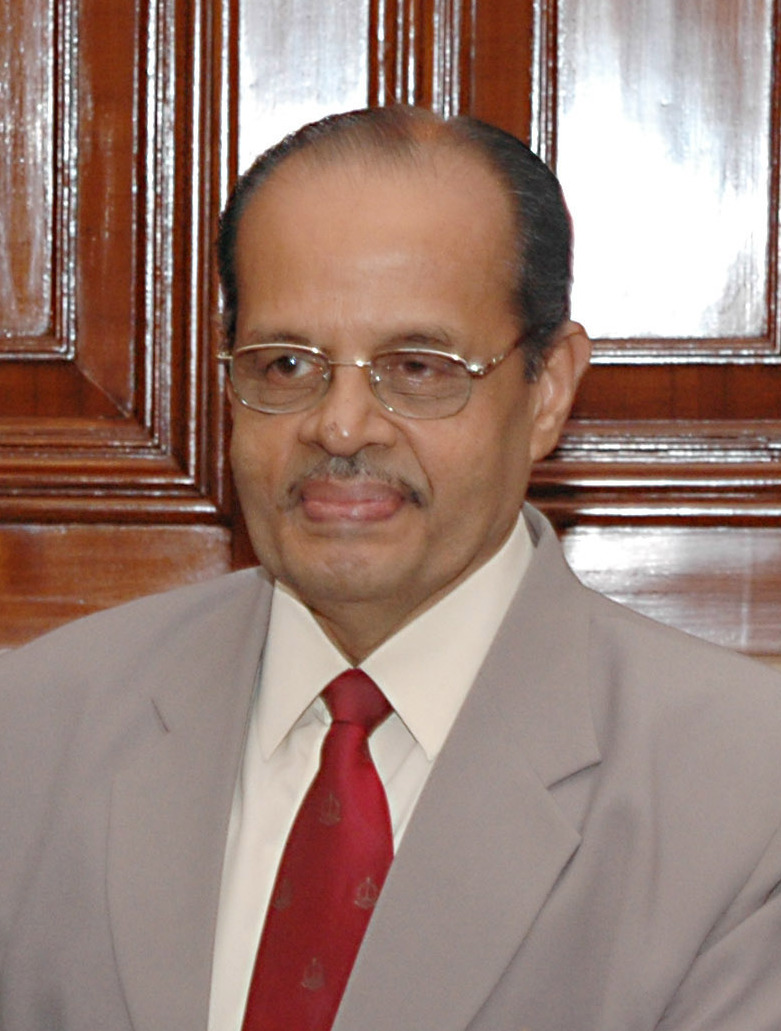
Father of Modern Indian Legal Education,N. R. Madhava Menon

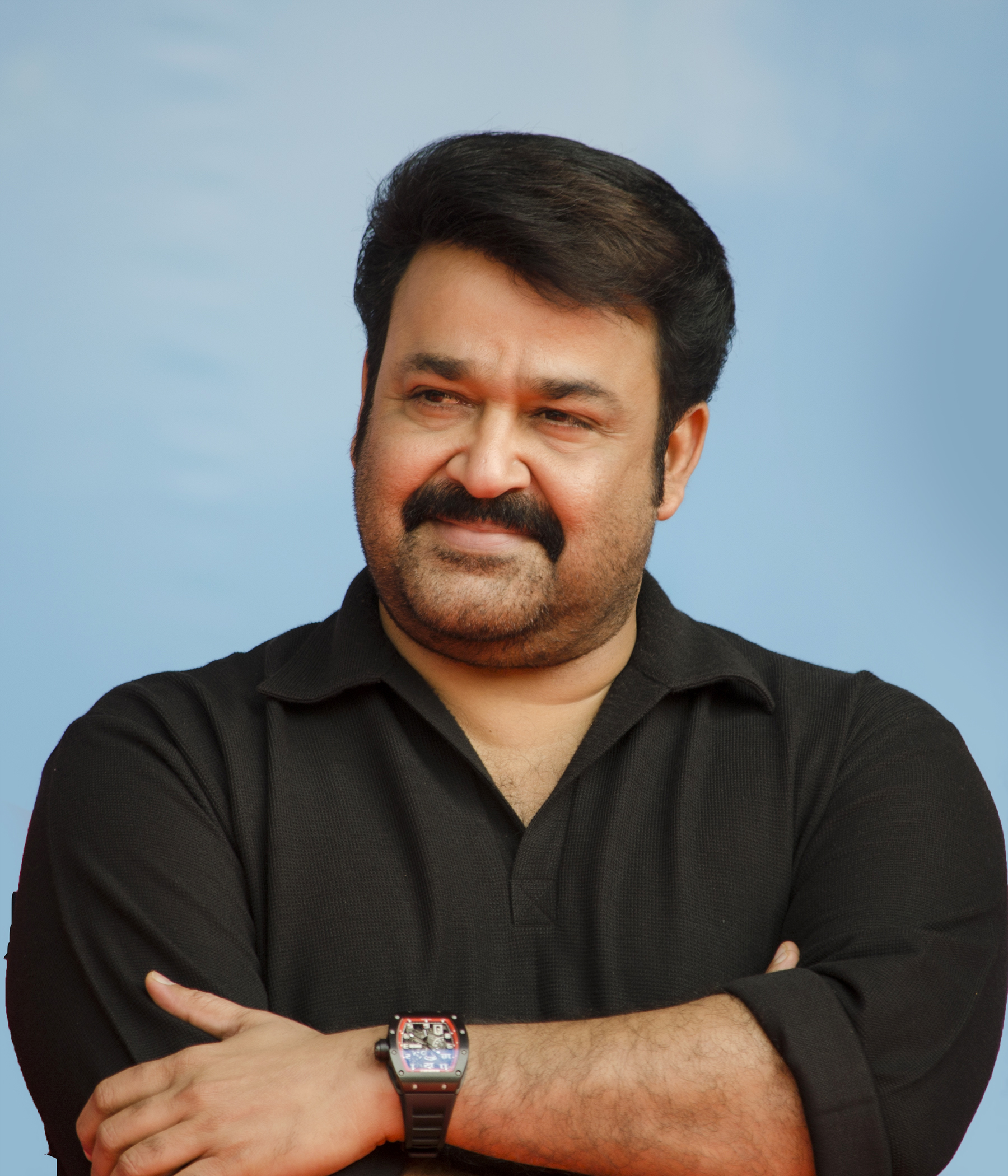
Indian film actor, Mohanlal

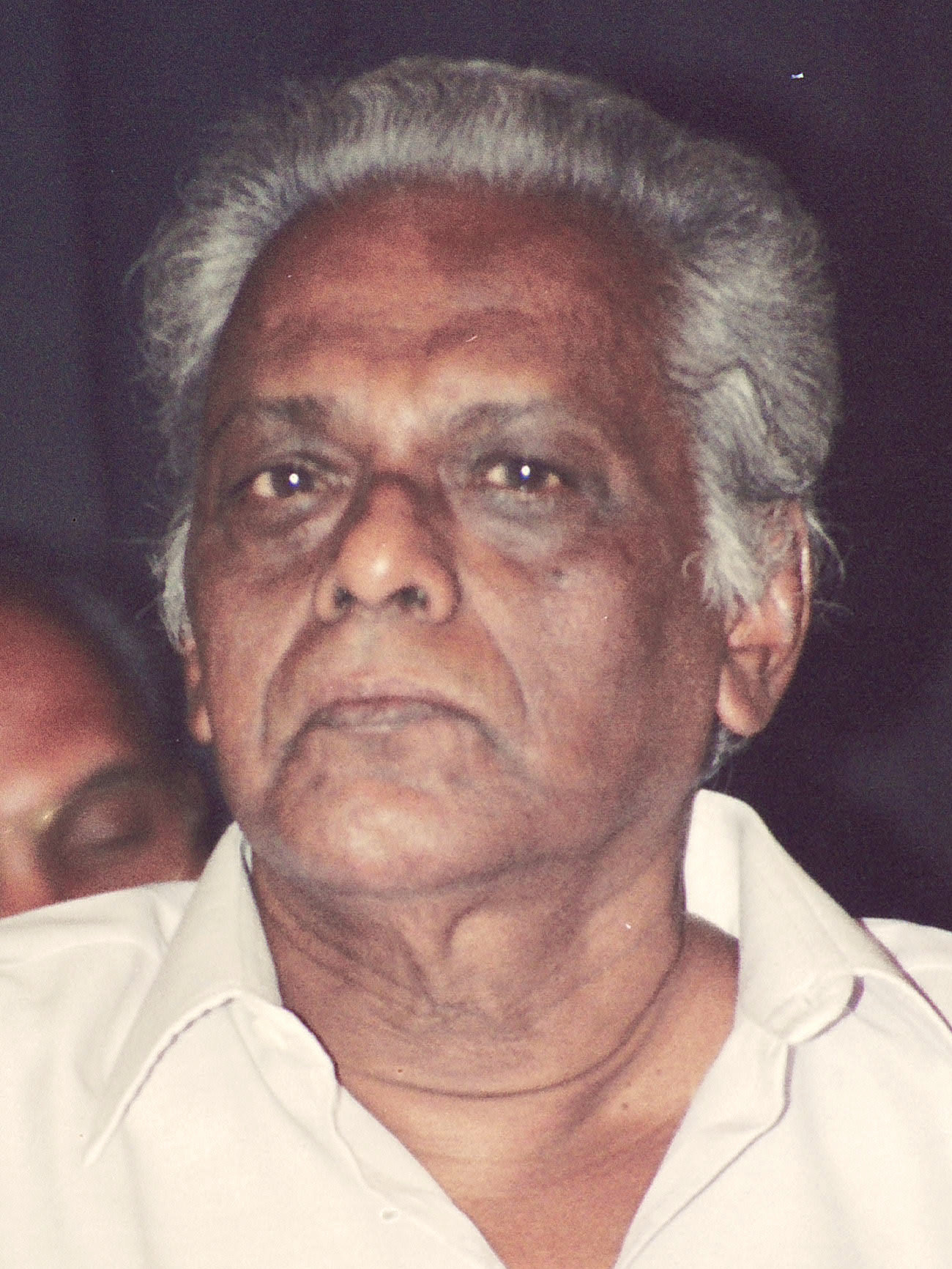
Music composer, G. Devarajan

=== Others ===
- A. K. Antony – 6th Chief Minister of Kerala and 25th Minister of Defence (India), Government of India
- Oommen Chandy – 10th Chief Minister of Kerala
- Pinarayi Vijayan – 12th Chief Minister of Kerala.
- V. D. Satheesan - 13th Chief minister of Kerala and former opposition leader.
- Vayalar Ravi – Former Minister of Civil Aviation, Government of India.
- Mullappally Ramachandran – Former Minister of Home Affairs, Government of India.
- P. J. Kurien- 11th Deputy Chairperson of the Rajya Sabha.
- Kodiyeri Balakrishnan – Former Minister for Home Affairs, Government of Kerala.
- Ramesh Chennithala - former Minister for Home Affairs, Government of Kerala.
- T. M. Thomas Isaac – Former Minister for Finance, Government of Kerala.
- K. B. Ganesh Kumar – Minister for Transport, 15th Kerala Assembly, Government of Kerala.
- K. N. Balagopal – Minister for Finance, 15th Kerala Assembly, Government of Kerala.
- Veena George – Minister for Health, 15th Kerala Assembly, Government of Kerala.
- Thiruvanchoor Radhakrishnan – Former Revenue Minister, Government of Kerala.
- M. B. Rajesh – 23rd Speaker of the Kerala Legislative Assembly.
- Adoor Prakash – Member of parliament, 18th Lok Sabha, Attingal Lok Sabha constituency.
- K. Sudhakaran – Member of parliament, 18th Lok Sabha, Kannur Lok Sabha constituency.
- N. K. Premachandran-Member of parliament, 18th Lok Sabha, Kollam Lok Sabha constituency.
- Rajmohan Unnithan – Member of parliament, 18th Lok Sabha, Kasaragod Lok Sabha constituency.
- Benny Behanan – Member of parliament, 18th Lok Sabha, Chalakudy Lok Sabha constituency.
- Anto Antony- Member of parliament, 18th Lok Sabha, Pathanamthitta Lok Sabha constituency.
- Kodikunnil Suresh – Member of parliament, 18th Lok Sabha, Mavelikara Lok Sabha constituency.
- Dean Kuriakose – Member of parliament, 18th Lok Sabha, Idukki Lok Sabha constituency.
- Francis George (politician) -Member of parliament, 18th Lok Sabha, Kottayam Lok Sabha constituency.
- Chandy Oommen – Member of the 15th Kerala Assembly.
- P. C. Vishnunadh – Member of the 15th Kerala Assembly.
- K. G. Balakrishnan – Former chief Judge of the Supreme Court of India .
- Alexander Thomas (judge) – Former judge of the High Court of Kerala.
- George Alencherry – Cardinal of the Syro-Malabar Catholic Church.
- Baselios Cleemis – Cardinal of the Syro-Malankara Catholic Church.
- Thomas Jessayyan Netto – Metropolitan Archbishop of the Roman Catholic Archdiocese of Trivandrum.
- Appu Kuttan – He has served as an advisor to American President Bill Clinton, India Prime Minister Rajiv Gandhi, the President of Venezuela, and the Mauritius Prime Minister.
- T. V. Paul – Former president of the International Studies Association.
- P. K. Abdul Aziz – Former Vice chancellor of Cochin University of Science and Technology, Aligarh Muslim University, University of Science and Technology Meghalaya.
- Jacob Punnoose – Former Director general of police of Kerala.
- T. P. Senkumar – Former Director general of police of Kerala.
- Jija Madhavan Harisingh – She was the first woman IPS officer (Indian Police Service) from South-India (Karnataka cadre).
- Resul Pookutty – Oscar award winner.
- Ameer Shahul – Indian author and environmentalist.
- Ambalapuzha Gopakumar – Malayalam poet, historian, and writer from Kerala.
- C. V. Ananda Bose – 21st Governor of West Bengal.
- P. S. Sreedharan Pillai – 19th Governor of Goa.
- S. Venkitaramanan – 18th Governor of the Reserve Bank of India.
- K. S. Chithra – Famous playback singer .
- Mammootty – Famous Malayalam actor .
- Thoppil Bhasi – Indian Malayalam language playwright, screenwriter, and film director.
- Venu Nagavally – Famous Malayalam actor & director.
- Adoor Gopalakrishnan – Indian Malayalam language screenwriter, and film director.
- Sreekumaran Thampi – Famous Lyricist. He has written over 3,000 songs for Malayalam Cinema.
- Murali (Malayalam actor) – Famous malayalam actor.
- Bharat Gopy – Famous Malayalam actor .
- Padmarajan – Famous Malayalam movie director .
- K. G. George – An Indian filmmaker and screenwriter who worked in the Malayalam cinema .
- Sibi Malayil – Famous Malayalam movie director .
- Blessy – Famous Malayalam movie director .
- Joshiy – Famous Malayalam movie director .
- Thilakan – Famous Malayalam actor .
- Nedumudi Venu – Famous malayalam actor.
- Sukumaran – Famous Malayalam actor .
- Karamana Janardanan Nair – Famous Malayalam Actor.
- Sudheer Karamana – Famous Malayalam Actor.
- Narendra Prasad – Famous Malayalam Actor.
- Fahadh Faasil – Famous Malayalam actor .
- Kunchacko Boban – Famous Malayalam actor .
- Murali Gopy – Famous Malayalam actor and screenwriter .
- M. Jayachandran – Indian composer, singer, and musician.
- Vayalar Sarath Chandra Varma -Malayalam lyricist and poet.
- Prakash Varma – Famous Malayalam actor and advertisement director.
- Santosh Sivan – Famous Indian cinematographer .
- K. J. Yesudas – Famous Indian playback singer .
- M. G. Sreekumar – Famous Indian playback singer.
- P. Jayachandran – Famous Indian playback singer.
- G. Venugopal – Famous Indian playback singer .
- Prem Nazir – Famous Malayalam actor .
- Madhu (actor) – prominent lead actor during the 1960s, 1970s and 1980s and has acted in more than 400 films.
- Priyadarshan – Famous Indian director and screenwriter.
- Jacob Abraham- American computer scientist and engineer.
- T. K. A. Nair – Formerly served as adviser to the Prime Minister of India with the rank of the Minister of State. He also previously served as Principal Secretary to Prime Minister of India.
- R. Hari Kumar – He served as 25th Chief of the Naval Staff.
- S. Suresh Babu- Indian film screenwriter.
- Kuncheria P Isaac – Former secretary of AICTE and first vice chancellor of A. P. J. Abdul Kalam Technological University, Thiruvananthapuram .
- M. A. Baby – General Secretary of the Communist Party of India (Marxist). Minister of Education in Kerala from 2006 to 2011.
- T. V. Rajan Babu – organic chemist who holds the position of Distinguished Professor of Chemistry in the College of Arts and Sciences at the Ohio State University.
- Veliyam Bharghavan- Secretary of the Communist Party of India.
- Tiffany Brar – Indian social activist.
- Sathyabhama Das Biju – An Indian amphibian biologist, wildlife conservationist and heads the Systematics Lab at the University of Delhi.
- G. Devarajan – Indian composer and Carnatic singer.
- Koppillil Radhakrishnan – 7th Chairman of the Indian Space Research Organisation.
- S. Somanath – 10th Chairman of the Indian Space Research Organisation.
- Sheena Rani – Program director of the Agni-V Intercontinental ballistic missile under DRDO.
- V. R. Lalithambika – An Indian engineer and former Director of ISRO Human Spaceflight Programme, played a key role in the Gaganyaan mission. She was conferred the Chevalier de la Légion d’Honneur, France's highest civilian award, for her contributions to Indo-French space cooperation.
- George Joseph (scientist) – Indian space scientist, best known for his contributions to the development of Remote sensing technology in India, especially Earth observation sensors.
- T. K. Alex – Former director of Indian Space Research Organisation Satellite Centre (ISAC).
- K. N. Ninan (scientist) – Former deputy director of Vikram Sarabhai Space Centre at ISRO, and later an emeritus professor at the Indian Institute of Space Science and Technology (IIST).
- C. Divakaran – State Executive Member of Communist Party of India.
- Renji Panicker – Actor, screenwriter, director in Malayalam films.
- Sanal Edamaruku – president of the Indian Rationalist Association.
- Salim Gangadharan – Chairman of the South Indian Bank.
- Kris Gopalakrishnan – Co-founder of Infosys.
- S. D. Shibulal – He was the chief executive officer and managing director of Infosys and one of its seven founding members.
- P. K. Gurudasan – An Indian politician, trade unionist, and a member of Communist Party of India (Marxist) .
- Thirunalloor Karunakaran – was a poet, scholar, and teacher.
- O. Madhavan – was an Indian theatre director and actor . He was one of the founding members of the Communist Party of India in Kerala.
- V. Madhusoodanan Nair – Indian poet and critic of Malayalam literature .
- Lopamudra R – Indian poet and translator writing in Malayalam language with the pen name Lopamudra.
- S. K. Satheesh – Indian meteorologist and a professor at the Centre for Atmospheric and Oceanic Sciences of the Indian Institute of Science (IISc).
- T. N. Seema – social worker, teacher, and politician who was an MP from Rajya Sabha elected from Kerala from 2010 to 2016 for the Communist Party of India.
- Bindu Ammini – Indian lawyer and lecturer at Government Law College, Kozhikode, and a Dalit activist.
- S. D. Shibulal – He was the chief executive officer and managing director of Infosys, and one of its seven founding members.
- M. S. Valiathan – An Indian cardiac surgeon . He was a president of the Indian National Science Academy and a National Research Professor of the Government of India.
- Jose Chacko Periappuram – An Indian cardiac surgeon and medical writer who performed the first successful heart transplant in the state of Kerala, as well as the first successful heart retransplant in the country.
- M. Krishnan Nair (doctor)-Founding director of the Regional Cancer Centre, Thiruvananthapuram. Government of India awarded him Padma Shri in 2001 for his contributions in the cancer care field.
- B Umadathan-Renowned Forensic Surgeon, he who unravelled many mysterious murders including Sukumara Kurup case.
- P Rema-Former head of the forensic department of the Thiruvananthapuram Medical College and wife of actor Jagadeesh.
- K. P. Haridas – Indian surgeon known for first successful liver resection.
- Mary Verghese – An Indian physician who was among the earliest pioneers of physical medicine and rehabilitation in India.
- D. Vinayachandran – Malayalam poet.
- Rajashree Warrier – one of India's foremost Bharatanatyam Dancers.
- Jagathy Sreekumar – Indian actor, director and playback singer, who has appeared in over 1500 Malayalam films.
- Jagadeesh- an Indian actor, screenwriter, and television presenter.
- Basil Joseph- Indian film actor and director who works in the Malayalam film industry.
- Suresh Gopi – actor, playback singer, television presenter and politician who is currently serving as the Minister of State for Petroleum and Natural Gas and the Minister of Tourism since June 2024.
- Mukesh (actor) – Actor and politician.
- Balachandra Menon – Famous Malayalam Actor & director.
- Parvathy Thiruvothu – Actress who predominantly works in Malayalam and Tamil films.

== See also ==
- Chithira Thirunal Balarama Varma
- University College of Engineering, Kariavattom
