= V. N. Krishnamurthy =

Dr. V. N. Krishnamurthy
- Born: 12 January 1937
- Known for: Indian space program
- Scientific career
- Fields: Chemistry
- Workplaces: Indian Space Research Organization; University of Pune

Dr. V. N. Krishnamurthy (born 12 January 1937) is the former Dy. Director of VSSC and Honorable Director of ISRO-UoP Interaction cell. He obtained his M.Sc. from Madras University and Ph.D. from Indian Institute of Science, Bangalore in 1967. He joined Vikram Sarabhai Space Centre, (Indian Space Research Organization) in February 1968 as chief of analytical facility. He became head of the Propellant Engineering Division in 1976, Group Director Propellants Group in 1986, and Deputy Director in 1989 before retiring in February 1997. After retiring, he became the Honorary Director of DRDO-ISRO-UoP Cells, which coordinates the activities undertaken for ISRO and DRDO at University of Pune. His tenure was over in August 2004 and after that he worked as an editor for two different encyclopaedias. Now he spends his time writing books and doing special guest lectures at universities and colleges in India.

== Research ==
His main interests are in solid propellants for launch vehicles and sounding rockets, polymers and materials indigenisation. He was responsible for the development of propellants based on HEF20, ISRO polyol, PBAN, CTPB and HTPB for launch vehicles. He indigenised and scaled up all the polymers used as binders in launch vehicles. His important contributions are development of HTPB based propellants currently used in Polar Satellite Launch Vehicle and Geostationary Launch Vehicle stages, igniters and auxiliary rocket motors.

He established facilities for the synthesis and scale up of polymers and propellants used in launch vehicles and satellite systems for India. He planned, designed and set up the ammonium perchlorate experimental plant (APEP) at Alwaye and polymer complex at Veli Trivandrum. He planned, established and commissioned a pilot plant at Ordnance Factory Itarsi as a step towards indigenisation of equipments used in double base propellants.

He has published more than 150 papers in national and international journals and presented more than 150 papers in national and international conferences.

== Awards ==
He was given the NRDC award in 1994 for contributions to propellants and for the development of a new technology of making big solid propellant grains. He was presented with the FIE foundation award at Ichalkaranji for overall contributions to polymers and propellants development for space programmes. He was awarded the Materials Research Society (MRSI) award for contributions to materials research for space programmes in 1997.

== Fellowships and memberships ==
- Honorary Fellowship of High Energy Material Society of India
- Indian Thermal Analysis Society
- Astronautical Society of India
- Polymer Society of India
- Society for Advancement of Electrochemical Science and Technology
- Materials Research Society of India

== Books ==
Editor, The Fertilizer Encyclopedia, ISBN 0-470-41034-5

Author, The Pesticide Encyclopedia, ISBN 978-1780640143

E. V. S. Namboodiry and V.N. Krishnamurthy, Liquid Hydrogen as a Fuel for Ground, Air and Naval Vehicles, In Progress in Hydrogen Energy edited by R. P. Dahia, pp. 133–158, ISBN 978-90-277-2440-3

A.J. Raghavan, & V.N. Krishnamurthy, Insulation, liner and inhibition system. In Propellants and explosives technology, edited by S. Krishnan, S.R. Chakravarthy, and S.K. Athithan. Allied Publishers, New Delhi, 1998. pp. 227–44.
