= K. P. Haridas =

Indian surgeon

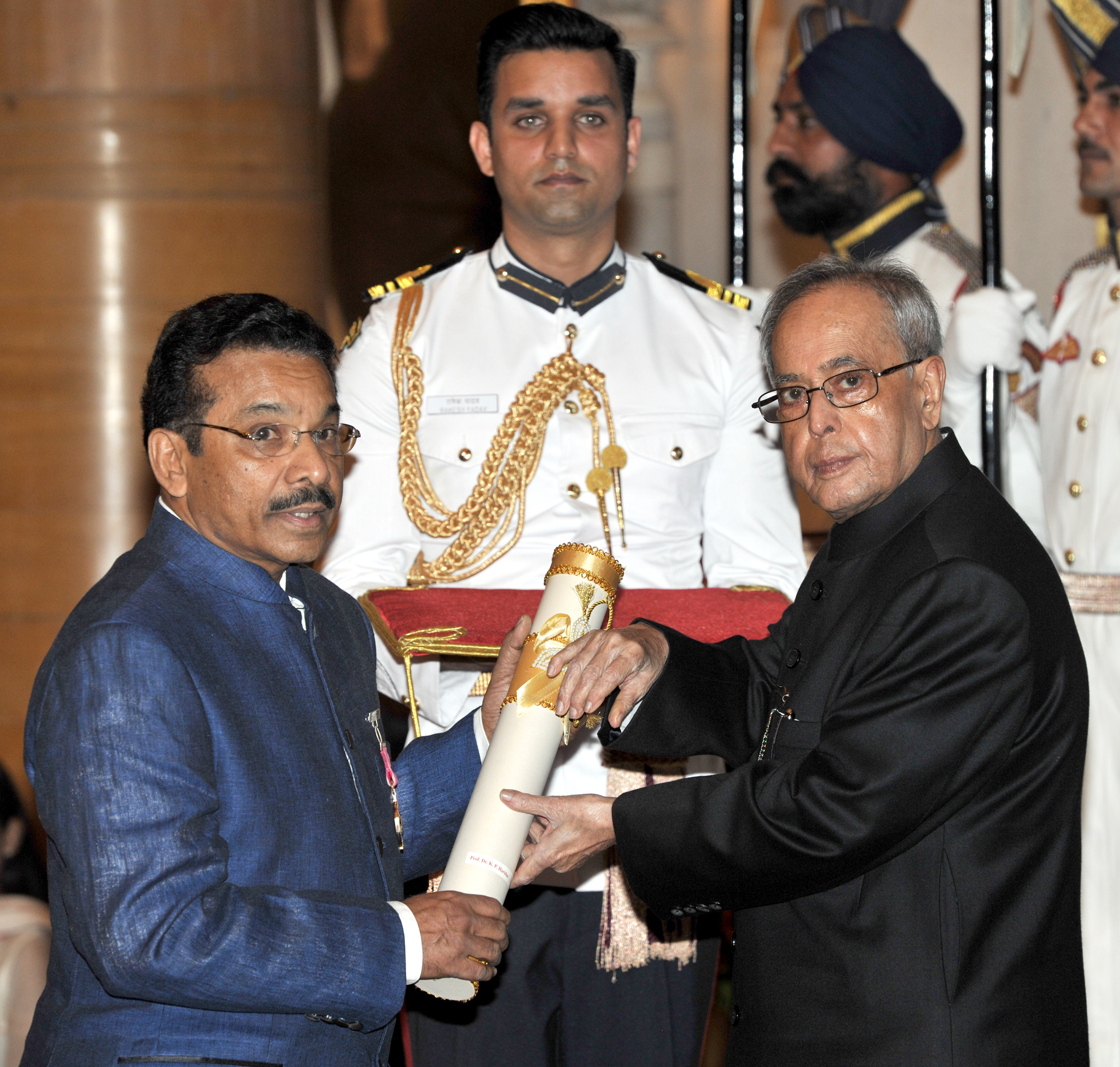
- The President, Shri Pranab Mukherjee presenting the Padma Shri Award to Prof. (Dr.) K.P. Haridas, at a Civil Investiture Ceremony, at Rashtrapati Bhavan, in New Delhi on April 08, 2015
- Born: Kerala, India
- Occupation: Surgeon
- Known for: first successful liver resection
- Awards: Padma Shri; BSICC Lifetime Achievement Award; Dr. Balsalam Memorial Award

K. P. Haridas is an Indian surgeon specializing in minimally invasive surgeries, and the founder of Chairman of Lords Hospital, a super-specialty healthcare centre in Thiruvananthapuram. He is credited with the first successful liver resection, which he performed at the Government Medical College, Thiruvananthapuram.

He is a recipient of the Lifetime Achievement Award from the British South India Council of Commerce (2014) and the Dr. Balsalam Memorial Award. He was honoured by the Government of India in 2015 with Padma Shri, the fourth-highest civilian Indian award.

== See also ==
- Minimally invasive surgery
