= Nellaya =

Village in Palakkad District, Kerala, India

Nellaya Nellaya City
- Village
- Location in Kerala, India
- Coordinates: 10°52′23″N 76°17′21″E
- Country: India
- State: Kerala
- District: Palakkad
- Established: 10-01-1962

Government
  - Type: Gram panchayat
  - Body: Nellaya Gramapanchayath

Area
  - Total: 24.41 km^{2} (9.42 sq mi)

Population (2011)
  - Total: 36,146
  - Density: 1,480.7/km^{2} (3,835/sq mi)

Languages
  - Official: Malayalam, English
- Time zone: UTC+5:30 (IST)
- PIN: 679335
- Vehicle registration: KL-51 Ottapalam, KL-52 Pattambi
- Nearest city: Cherpulassery
- Website: panchayat.lsgkerala.gov.in/nellayapanchayat

Nellaya is a village in Palakkad district in the state of Kerala, India. The village has its own gram panchayat.

== Demographics ==
At the 2011 India census, Nellaya had a population of 36,146 (16,888 males and 19,258 females).

== Elected members 2021-2025 ==
Ward No	Ward	Member
1	Kulappida	Anwar Sadath
2	Marayamangalam	Vishnuraj
3	Irumbalassery	Shifanath
4	Nellaya	Pratheep
5	Elappamkotta	Zeenath
6	Pulakkad	Sandya Santhosh
7	Pombilaya	Vasantha K P (vice president)
8	Kizakkekara	Anitha
9	Moloor	Muhammed Ali
10	Pottachira	Geetha
11	Mampattaparambu	Ramakrishnan N P
12	Chemmamkuzhi	Afeefa Muneer
13	Kizhakkumparambu	Jisha Vinu
14	Ezhuvanthala	P K Muhammed Shafi
15	Ambedkar Colony	Sreeja
16	Pattissery	Shabana Rafeek
17	Marayamangalam South	Ajesh K (president)
18	Varanamangalam	A Moideenkutty
19	Mavundiri	Arun Kumar

== Former presidents ==
Name	Year
A.P Janardanan	1963
Shankaranarayana Variyar	1965
Op Ayyappanezhuthachan	1970
A Balakrishanan Nair	1979
M Moideenkutty Master	1984
M Vilasini Kovilamma	1986
Mumthas	1995 -1996
Kp Vasantha	1997 - 2000
Kb Subash	2000 - 2002
M Moideenkutty Master	2003 - 2005
M Moideenkutty Master	2005 - 2010
Kp Vasantha	2005 - 2010

== See also ==
- Ezhuvanthala
