= C. O. Karunakaran =

Indian doctor

Rajyasevanirata Dr. C.O. Karunakaran
- Born: 1892; Mavelikkara
- Died: 30 November 1970; Thiruvananthapuram
- Monuments: Dr. C.O. Karunakaran Auditorium, Dr. C.O. Karunakaran Avenue
- Education: MBBS, DPH, DTM & H (Camb.), DB (Lond.)
- Alma mater: Madras Medical College, University of Cambridge, University of London
- Occupation: Doctor
- Title: Principal, Government Medical College, Thiruvananthapuram
- Term: 1951–52
- Successor: Dr. Axel J. Hojer
- Spouse: Parukutty

Dr. C. O. Karunakaran, a notable physician, bacteriologist and microbiologist, was the founder of Government Medical College, Thiruvananthapuram. He was the first Principal of the college and was also the Special Officer appointed for establishing the first medical university in the erstwhile state of Travancore-Cochin.

== Early life ==
Born in 1892 at Mavelikkara, C.O. Karunakaran had his initial schooling in Mavelikkara Government High School. After the intermediate in Maharaja's College, Ernakulam he joined Madras Medical College for Bachelor of Medicine and Bachelor of Surgery.

== Academic life ==
Following his study in Madras Medical College, he completed DPH, DTMH and DB from University of Cambridge and University of London. He worked for a short period as the Medical Officer of an estate and then as the Health Officer of Thiruvananthapuram. Later he took over as the Superintendent of Public Health Laboratory near Civil Hospital (present Trivandrum General Hospital) at Thiruvananthapuram. Sir C.P. Ramaswamy Aiyer realising his abilities, sent him to United States of America for industrial training. When he returned he improvised the laboratory and in 1948, he was appointed as the Special Officer for establishing the first medical college in the state of Travancore-Cochin at Trivandrum. With his effort the plans for construction of the Government Medical College, Thiruvananthapuram was finalised in a year and construction of the college completed in just 16 months.

He was appointed as the first principal of Government Medical College, Thiruvananthapuram and Professor of Microbiology. Realizing his dream for getting maximum international exposure to the students of the college, World Health Organization at his request sent the then DHS of Sweden, Dr. Axel J. Hojer as an expert. Dr. C.O. Karunakaran then stepped down as Principal and gave the Principalship to Dr. Hojer and continued as Vice Principal under him.. He was also instrumental in bringing many international experts including Dr. Alexander Fleming to the college.

He has also served as a member and Dean of Senate and Syndicate of the University of Kerala. He had been the Chairman of Travancore Medical Council and President of Indian Medical Association from 1958 to 1959. He was awarded the RajyaSevaNirata award by Sri Chithira Tirunal considering his contributions to the country.

The first voicing for family planning in India was by Dr. C.O. Karunakaran in his famous Karthikapally speech in 1925. In 1957 he himself was behind the family planning drive started in Kerala and was the chief adviser of State Family Planning Board and Family Planning Communication Research project.

He died on 30 November 1970. In his will he had stated that no state honours or religious rituals be performed at his funeral. It also had stated that the body should not be kept for more than six hours.

== Family ==
He is the son of Alummoottil Padeettathil Ummini Kunju Channar and Kunjupennu Channatti. His elder brother, C.O. Madhavan was the Chief Secretary and first Mayor of Thiruvananthapuram city. His younger brother Dr. C.O. Damodaran was the Commissioner of Kerala Public Service Commission.
