= Rajashree Warrier =

Indian Bharatanatyam dancer

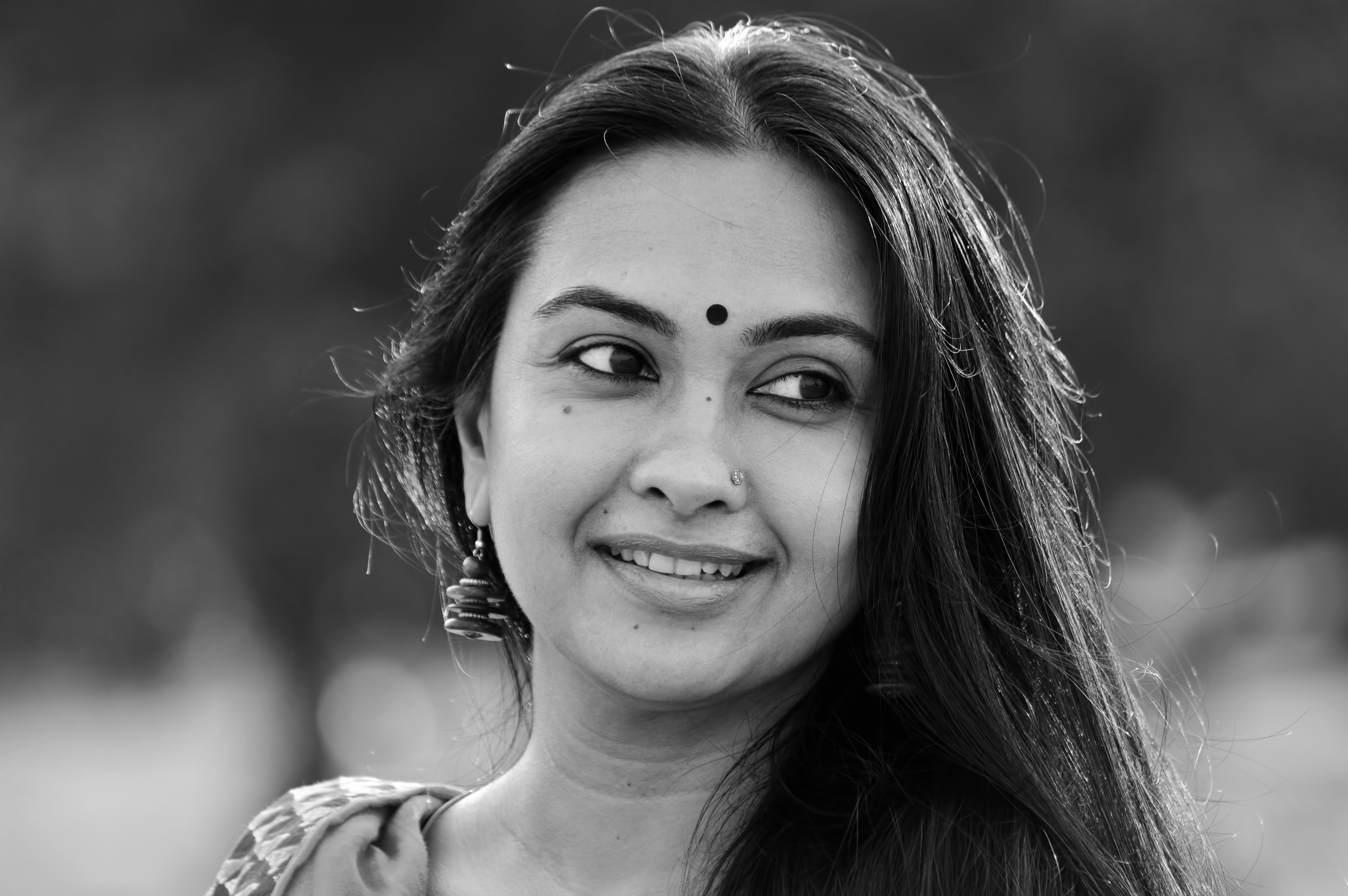
- Born: Rajashree Warrier; 31 January 1974 (age 52); Thiruvananthapuram, Kerala, India
- Occupation: Bharatanatyam
- Years active: 1990–present
- Awards: Devdasi National Award 2014; Kerala Sangeetha Nataka Akademi Award 2013

Rajashree Warrier is a Bharatanatyam dancer, musician, writer and Educator. She holds a Phd. in Music from the Department of Music, Kerala University. She is a pioneer in introducing Malayalam poems, folk music and compositions of Social reformer Sree narayana guru in her dance choreographies.

== Early life and education ==
Rajasree Warrier was born and brought up in Thiruvananthapuram, Kerala, India. She learned Bharatanatyam under the tutelage of V. Mythili and Jayanthi Subramaiam. She was trained in carnatic music under Mullamudu Harihara Iyer, Perumbavoor G. Raveendranath, Parassala Ponnammal and B. Sasikumar. Warrier also holds a postgraduate diploma in journalism.

== Career ==
- Known for her extraordinary vision in the conceptualization of visual narratives make her choreographies stand apart from the rest.
- Acclaimed for her impeccable Abhinaya, her in-depth musical knowledge and poetic skills add beauty to her dance creations.
- Through her choreographic series titled 'Nattumozhi', she adds colloquial identity and new body idioms.
- Some of her choreographic perspectives can be found in Natyasutra online, a YouTube dance portal.

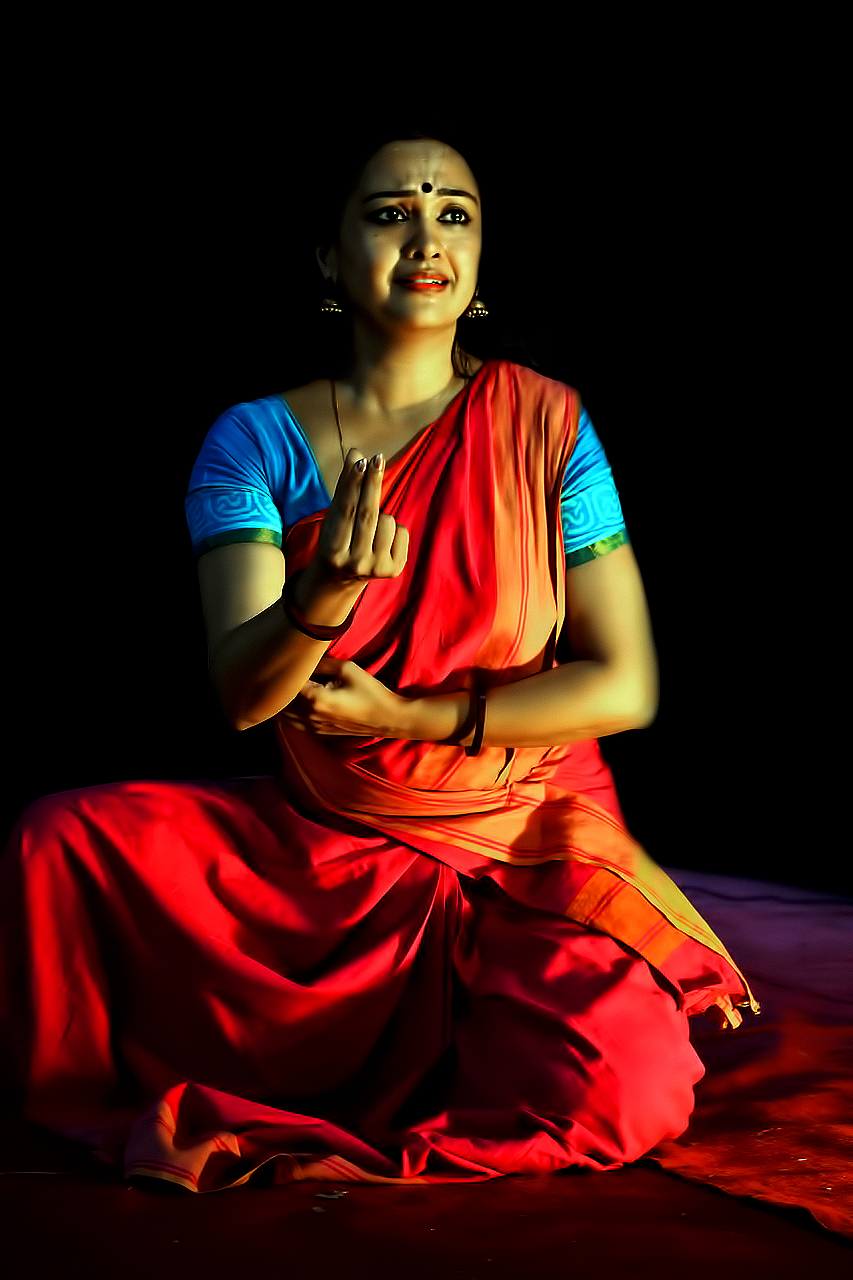
Bharathanatyam Workshop at Pattambi - Palakkad On 18 May 2014

=== Media ===
Warrier anchored the breakfast show Suprabhatham on Asianet for four years. She has also anchored, scripted and produced several programmes on DD Kerala, Amrita TV and Asianet.

== Publications ==
Warrier has written two books, Narthaki published by DC Books in 2013 and Nruthakala published by Chintha Publications in 2011. Dr. Warrier also writes poems in English. Her poems have appeared in reputed literary magazines like Journal of Literature and Aesthetics (an international peer-reviewed, indexed Journal ), Kerala Literary Survey (English Journal of Kerala Sahitya Academy ).

== Awards and honours ==
- Kerala Prabha Award 2025
- Kshetrakala Fellowship, Govt. of Kerala 2024.
- First ever "Revathy Pattathanam Natya Puraskaram 2022
- Dev dasi National Award for Bharatanatyam 2014 for outstanding creative contributions. Presented by Dev Dasi Nruthya Mandira, Bhuvaneswar.
- Kalasree Title and Kerala Sangeetha Nataka Akademi Award 2013 for Bharatanatyam.
- VS Sharma Endowment Award from Kerala Kalamandalam for the contributions in the field of Bharatanatyam, 2013.
- Invited as Jury of 'Books and Articles' in Kerala State Film Award 2014.
- Kalaratna Puraskar given by Vayalar Samskaarika Samithi
- Mahila Tilak Title and Award for the contributions in Indian Classical Dance conferred by Social welfare department, Government of Kerala,2012.
- Indian Council for Cultural Relations – Empanelled Bharatanatyam Artist.
- Sai Natya Ratna conferred by Satya Sai Seva Organisation, 2010.
- ‘Natana Shiromani’ Award conferred by Chilanka Dance Academy, 2009.
- Recipient of Navarasam Sangeeta Sabha Award for Bharatanatyam, 2007.

== Sources ==
- Rajashreewarrier.com
- Narthaki.com
- Deccanherald.com
- Archives.deccanchronicle.com
- Deccanchronicle.com
- Thehindu.com
- Newindianexpress.com
- Timesofindia.indiatimes.com
