= M. Krishnan Nair (doctor) =

Indian oncologist (1939–2021)

- Born: 1939; Peroorkada, Thiruvananthapuram, Kerala
- Died: 28 October 2021 (aged 81); Vellayambalam, Thiruvananthapuram, Kerala
- Occupation: Oncologist
- Known for: Oncology
- Awards: Padma Shri; Bhishmacharya Award

M. Krishnan Nair (1939 – 28 October 2021) was an Indian oncologist. He was the founding director of the Regional Cancer Centre, Thiruvananthapuram, a director of the S.U.T. Institute of Oncology, and Trivandrum Cancer Center(TCC), part of SUT Royal Hospital in Thiruvananthapuram (Trivandrum) and a professor at the Amrita Institute of Medical Sciences & Research in Kochi. The Government of India awarded him the fourth highest civilian award of the Padma Shri in 2001 for his contributions in the cancer care field.

== Birth and education ==
Krishnan Nair was born to Madhavan Nair and Meenakshi Amma in 1939 at Peroorkada. Nair earned his MBBS degree from University of Kerala, India in 1963, then went on to earn a MD (Radiotherapy and Clinical Oncology) from the University of Punjab in 1968. In 1972, he earned a FRCR (Clinical Oncology) from the Royal College of Radiologists in London.

== Work in India ==
As founding director of RCC, he was responsible for establishing one of the largest comprehensive cancer centres in India and for initiating programmes in Community Oncology, Pain and Palliative Care, and Paediatric Oncology for the first time in India. He was a member of the expert group that drew up the National Cancer Control Plan of India. He served the World Health Organization (WHO) for more than a decade in their Expert Advisory Panel on Cancer. He was the only member from India on the Advisory Committee of the Director General, WHO and Cancer Technical Group (CTG) of WHO.

He introduced for the first time an institution oriented and extremely inexpensive cancer insurance plan in India called Cancer Care for Life. He established five district-level peripheral centres for prevention and early detection and a pain relief and palliative care network with Morphine availability for terminal cancer patients.

He implemented a 10-Year Action Plan in Kerala which reduced tobacco consumption, improved early detection, enhanced therapy facilities, and provided palliative care and pain relief to substantial sections of dying cancer patients. This programme finds mention in IARC (Managerial Guidelines for NCCP (2002), World Cancer Report (2003)), and WHO documents.

He has assisted the World Health Organization as Consultant in several major workshops and meetings such as design modification of teletherapy machines 1992, preparation of managerial guidelines for cancer control 1994 and 2000, preparation of pain and palliative care guidelines 1994, the Cancer Technical Group meeting 2005, and the Cancer Advisory Group meeting 2005. He has served as the Director of the World Health Organization Collaborating Centre (No.130) since it was established until his retirement in November 2003. He has served as the Short-term Consultant in IARC three times and was a visiting scholar in Allegheny General Hospital, Stanford University, and University of Southern California.

Nationally, he has served as President, Association of Radiation Oncologists of India, Member of the Scientific Advisory Board of the Indian Council of Medical Research, and Member of the Board of Radiation and Isotope Technology of the Department of Atomic Energy of India. He has done an exhaustive study on human health effects of background radiation in coastal areas of Kerala.

Nair has also published more than 300 papers in the field of medicine.

== Illegal drug trials controversy ==
Between November 1999 and February 2000, while Dr. M. Krishnan Nair was serving as the director, the RCC in association with the Johns Hopkins University conducted a series of drug trials on 26 patients.

This was the theme for a documentary for BBC.

Quote from Frontline (2001). (see external links):

"AFTER a four-month-long inquiry, the US-based Johns Hopkins University (JHU) has stated what was already quite obvious: that the controversial experiments at the Regional Cancer Centre (RCC) in Thiruvananthapuram were the first human trials of the potentially anti-cancer chemicals developed at the Hopkins Biology Laboratory; that those chemicals had not been properly tested in animals before they were tried out on patients at the RCC; that the Biology Professor who conducted the experiments was not qualified or authorised to do experiments involving human subjects; that she did not have the mandatory approvals from the university's institutional review boards authorised to make ethical clearances; that she did not have the US government's approval to export the chemicals used in the trial to India; that the clinical trial conducted at the RCC did not meet the standards for research with human subjects; and that adequate and proper consent was not obtained from the patients before they were made part of the experiments.

On 12 November, JHU announced the much-awaited findings of the inquiry by its faculty investigative committee into the "drug" trial conducted on 26 cancer patients at the RCC between November 1999 and February 2000.

A statement issued by the JHU Office of News and Information said (significantly, without naming the Biology Professor concerned, Dr. Ru Chih Huang) that "one of its scientists" tested experimental cancer drugs on patients in India "without required federal or university approvals and without adequate preliminary tests in animals".

However Dr. Krishnan Nair, as the Director of the Institute in India, denied the ethical misconduct even after the report came from Johns Hopkins. This case is one of the study materials in Public Health classes in majority of universities in Europe and USA. The Indian Government as well as the Institute (RCC) never admitted any wrongdoing even after the media repeatedly exposed the pain and sufferings of patients who participated in the study. Special interest groups also tried to capitalise on the situation for political gains. World Health Organization's data revealed that 2031 people died between 2008–2011 during drug trials in India. However, an independent enquiry commission set up by the Government of India acquitted Dr Nair of any wrongdoing. Not withstanding the controversy, Dr. Krishnan Nair was honoured with Padmashri (one of the highest honours in the country) in consideration of his contributions to the cause of cancer care and control.

== Positions held ==
- 1965–68 Lecturer, Medical College, Trivandrum, Kerala, India
- 1969–1971 Assistant Professor, Medical Colleges, Kottayam / Trivandrum, Kerala, India
- 1971–1973 Associate Professor, Medical College, Trivandrum, Kerala, India
- 1975–1981 Professor of Clinical Oncology and Radiotherapy Medical College, Trivandrum, Kerala, India
- 1981–2003 Director, Regional Cancer Centre, Trivandrum, Kerala, India
- 1 February 2004-20?? Professor of Clinical Oncology, Amrita Institute of Medical Sciences and Research, Kochi, Kerala, India
- February 2004-20?? Director and Consultant Clinical Oncologist, SUT Institute of Oncology, Trivandrum, Kerala, India.

== Honors and awards ==
- Member, Expert Panel on Cancer of the World Health Organization (WHO)
- President, Association of Radiation Oncologists of India 1984–1986
- Member, Governing Body, Regional Cancer Centre, Guwahati, Assam, Calcutta, and Bangalore
- Member, National Cancer Control Programme Core Committee, 1981–1985
- Fellow of the Indian College of Radiology (FICR)
- Founder Fellow of the Indian Medical Science Academy (FIMSA)
- Pasupathy Nath Wahi Cancer Award 1988
- Indian Council of Medical Research (ICMR) Sandoz Oration Award in Cancer Research 1989
- Vimala Shah Award of the Banaras Hindu University 1991
- PK Haldar Memorial Oration of association of Radiation Oncologists of India
- Bhishmacharya Award of outstanding contribution in the field of Medicine, 1993
- Leadership Award by Trivandrum Management Association 1994
- Dorab Tata Oration Award (1996) by Indian Society of Oncology
- Roll of Honour (1996) by International Union Against Cancer (UICC), Geneva
- Dr.L.H.Lobo Memorial Oration 1997 by Dr.L.H.Lobo Memorial Trust, Ludhiana
- Padma Shri Award by Government of India in 2001

== Death ==
Krishnan Nair died on 28 October 2021, at the age of 81 in his home in Vellayambalam. He was receiving treatment for cancer prior to his death and died from age-related ailments.
