= R. Kesavan Nair =

Former professor of surgery at Medical College in Kerala, India

Dr. R. Kesavan Nair
- Born: 6 September 1910
- Died: 30 June 2005 (aged 94); Thiruvananthapuram
- Title: Superintendent, Medical College, Thiruvananthapuram
- Term: 1954–1962
- Spouse: Sarojini Amma

Dr R Kesavan Nair (valia Kesavan Nair) was the Professor of Surgery at Medical College, Thiruvananthapuram and the first Superintendent of the Medical College Hospital. He is Kerala's First civil surgeon. He along with Dr. C.O. Karunakaran was the founding fathers of the first Medical College in Kerala.

Dr. Nair graduated in Bachelor of Medicine and Bachelor of Surgery from Madras Medical College in 1937. He later joined as the Chief of Surgery in General Hospital, Thiruvananthapuram. Later on he went abroad for further training and was the first person from Travancore to get a degree of Fellow of Royal College of Surgeons (in 1930). When Pt. Jawaharlal Nehru commissioned the Medical College hospital in Thiruvananthapuram in 1954, he was appointed as the Chief Surgeon and Superintendent of the hospital the post he held till 1962. In 1962, he joined Calicut Medical College and later retired as the Principal of Kottayam Medical College in 1966. He also served as the President of Travancore-Cochin Medical Council and member of Medical Council of India.

The road from Medical College junction to Murinjapalam is to be named in his honour.

== Quotes ==
- "Many of my friends and patients have asked if doctors would become hard-hearted seeing the pain and agony of patients. In reality, doctors learn to hide their worries, otherwise there will not be anyone to console the patients and their families."

== See also ==
- Medical College, Thiruvananthapuram
