= Ordnance Factory Itarsi =

- Census town
- Location in Madhya Pradesh, India Ordnance Factory Itarsi (India)
- Coordinates: 22°34′47″N 77°50′51″E
- Country: India
- State: Madhya Pradesh
- District: Narmadapuram

Population (2001)
  - Total: 10,265

Languages
  - Official: Hindi
- Time zone: UTC+5:30 (IST)
- ISO 3166 code: IN-MP
- Vehicle registration: MP
- Website: http://ofi.nic.in

Ordnance Factory Itarsi is a census town in Narmadapuram district in the Indian state of Madhya Pradesh.

== Demographics ==
As of 2001 India census, Ordnance Factory Itarsi had a population of 10,265. Males constitute 53% of the population and females 47%. Ordnance Factory Itarsi has an average literacy rate of 86%, higher than the national average of 59.5%: male literacy is 92%, and female literacy is 77%. In Ordnance Factory Itarsi, 7% of the population is under 6 years of age.
