= A. Marthanda Pillai =

Indian neurosurgeon

- Medical career
- Profession: Neurosurgeon
- Awards: 2010-2011 Padma Shri Award

A. Marthanda Pillai is an Indian neurosurgeon. In 2011 he was the recipient of a Padma Shri Award for medicine. He is the first former National President and former Vice-President of the Indian Medical Association (IMA) in Kerala State to receive this national award. He led the protest against proposed National Medical Commission Bill for IMA.

In the private sector he is currently the Managing Director of Ananthapuri Hospitals & Research Institute in Trivandrum.
