= G. Shankar =

Indian architect

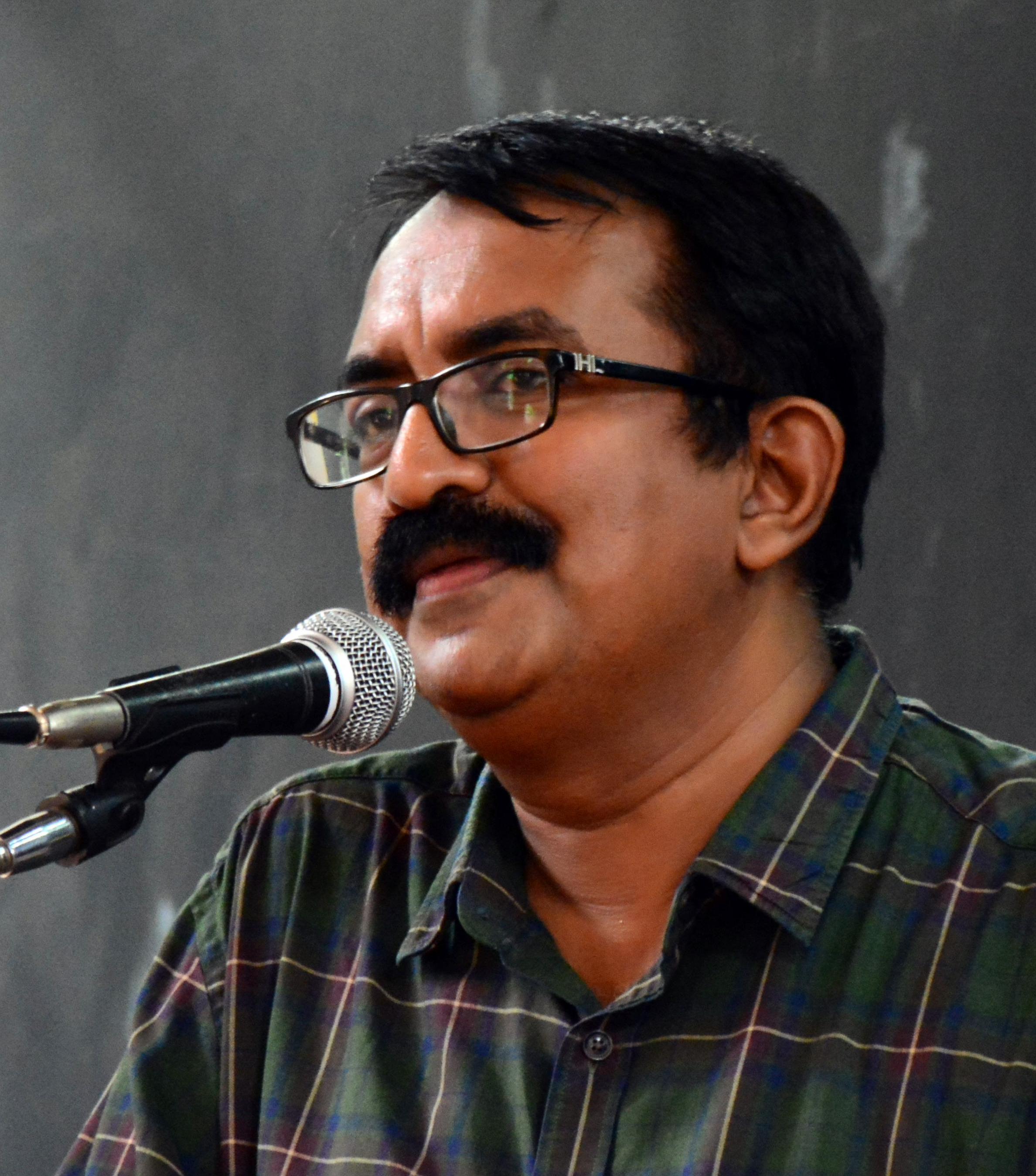
G. Shankar

Gopalan Nair Shankar, known as G. Shankar, is an architect from Kerala, India. He advocates the use of locally available materials, sustainability, eco-friendliness and cost effectiveness. He founded the Habitat Technology Group, Thiruvananthapuram, in 1987 and as of 2012, serves on a number of boards. He did his architecture studies (B.Arch) from College of Engineering, Trivandrum (1982 batch) and later did M.S. from Birmingham School of Architecture, UK and postgraduate diploma in journalism. He has also won 3 national awards for green architecture, slum resettlement and eco city design.. His attitude to "green architecture" has gained him a reputation as the "people's architect". Shankar was awarded the Padma Shri by the Government of India in 2011.
