= Regional Cancer Centre, Thiruvananthapuram =

Medical research centre in India

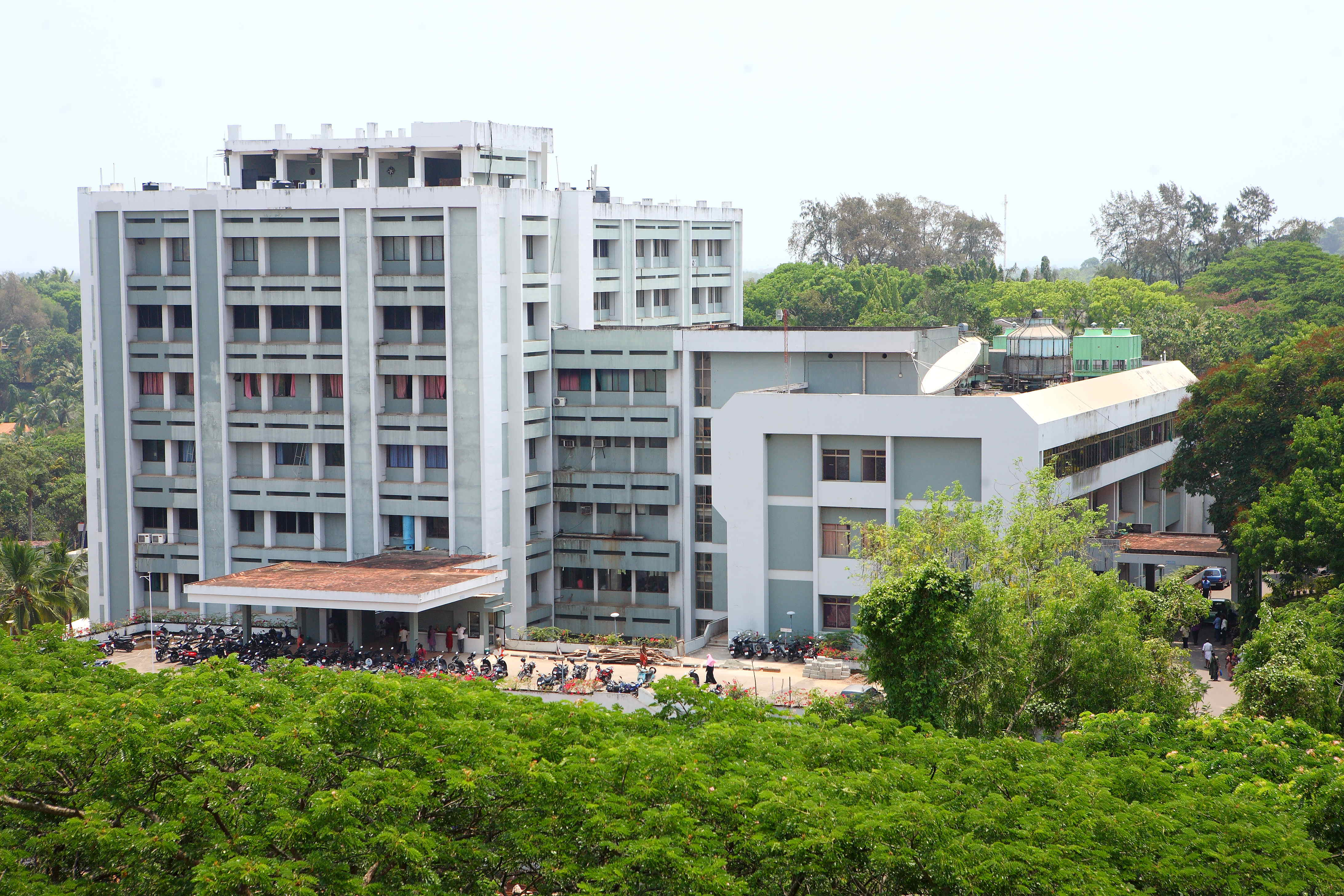
- Type: Cancer care and research center
- Established: 1981; 45 years ago
- Director: Dr. Rejnish Kumar R.
- Location: Thiruvananthapuram, Kerala, India; 8.52014760°N 76.92451299°E
- Nickname: RCC
- Website: http://rcctvm.gov.in/

The Regional Cancer Centre (RCC) at Thiruvananthapuram is a cancer care hospital and research centre. It was established in 1981 by the Government of Kerala and the Government of India. It is located in the Thiruvananthapuram Medical College campus in Thiruvananthapuram, the capital city of the state of Kerala. It was established as an expansion of the Radiation Therapy / Radiotherapy department of Medical College Trivandrum. It is a tertiary care center for the managements of all types of cancers. The clinics are mainly on haematology, lymphoreticular, soft tissue, bone, head and neck, breast, CNS, gynaecological, urinary, chest, gastro, paediatric oncology and thyroid.

== Background ==
The RCC was established in 1981 as one of six such centres (currently 26) in India. During the formation period the state government transferred a few departments of the Medical College, Thiruvananathapuram, which were primarily concerned with cancer care to the Regional Cancer Centre.

The RCC is an autonomous scientific institution sponsored jointly by the government of Kerala and the government of India. It has been designated as a Science and Technology Centre in the health sector by the state government. The first Community Oncology division in India was established in RCC, Thiruvananthapuram, in 1985.

The center has evolved policies and priorities to provide oncology facilities to the less privileged in the community like children and less affluent members by giving free chemotherapy and advanced diagnostic facilities like CT scan, isotope scanning etc. Nearly 60% patients receive free treatment and another 29 percent in the middle income group receive treatment at subsidized rates. Free chemotherapy is given to all children irrespective of family income. Adults with curable cancers also receive free treatment. During the last five years, drugs worth Rs.80 lakhs have been supplied free of cost to the low income group.

Annually more than 17,000 new cancer cases, more than 50,000 follow-up visits of old cases and more than 80,000 non-cancer patients for investigations report at the centre. During the last five years, there was a 50 percent increase in the registration of both cancer and non-cancer cases.

The government of Kerala has declared RCC a Science and Technology Centre of Excellence in cancer research and treatment, and as a state research organization of the Ministry of Science & Technology of the government of India.

Every year nearly 16,000 new patients visit the clinics from South India and neighboring countries. Nearly 60% of these cancer patients receive primary care at the hospital of which over 70% are treated almost free of charge. Over 500 patients attend the OPD daily for medical advice, care or for follow-up treatment.r.

=== Hospital Based Cancer Registry ===
The Hospital Based Cancer Registry (HBCR), Trivandrum, was established at the Regional Cancer Centre in 1982 as part of the National Cancer Registry Programme of the Indian Council of Medical Research. The HBCR has been collecting information on cancer patients reporting to the RCC, Trivandrum Medical College Hospital, SAT hospital for Women and Children and Dental College, Trivandrum from 1 January 1982.

== Objectives ==
The RCC was created to meet the following objectives:

- Evolve a cancer control programme for South-Western India.
- Offer facilities for diagnosis and assessment of cancer by histopathological, cytological, clinicopathological, biochemical, advanced imageology, endoscope, nuclear medicine and molecular diagnostics.
- Provide facilities for treatment and management of cancer by radiotherapy, surgery, chemotherapy, radiation medicine and immunotherapy.
- Establish facilities for fundamental and clinical research relating to cancer.
- Providing a palliative care service for advanced cancer patients.
- Establish undergraduate and post graduate training in oncology in collaboration with other centres of academic and clinical skill.
- Generate manpower for the region in the field of oncology, both medical as well as para-medical.

== Cytopathology Division ==
The Cytopathology Division provides investigations in addition to conventional histopathology and cytology.

== Imageology Division ==
The Imageology and Nuclear Medicine Divisions use diagnostic imaging technology to provide diagnosis.

== Pain management ==
Pain management and palliative care for advanced and incurable stages of cancer are undertaken by a dedicated unit.

== Progress ==
- An area of progress has been radiological imaging techniques using ultrasound, CT scanners, and more dynamic real time nuclear medicine scanning.
- Pathology has progressed from basic histopathology to molecular pathology with emphasis on predictive assays for identifying the high-risk prognostic factors.
- Work has been carried out in areas of rehabilitation, physiotherapy, occupational therapy, speech therapy, psychology and medical social work.

RCC is a training centre for cancer education and research by national and international organizations such as WHO, IAEA and UICC. RCC is a post-graduate teaching center and is affiliated to Kerala University of Health Science. It runs super specialty courses like MCh(Surgical Oncology), DM Medical Oncology, DM Pediatric Oncology, MCh Head & Neck Surgery, and MCh Gynecological Oncology. It also started MD Radiotherapy, MD Anaesthesiology, and MD Pathology. Every year more than 400 students undergo training at the centre in medical and paramedical disciplines.

== See also ==
Medical College Campus Church (Trivandrum)
