= List of Loyola College, Chennai people =

Alumnus of Loyola College, Chennai are also called Loyolites. Alumni of the college have included contributors in various fields of law, politics, civil services, science, education, business, sports and entertainment. The names in this list are presented in alphabetical order of surname/family name. This is not an exhaustive list.

== Academics ==
=== Educational institution founders and presidents ===
- Malcolm S Adiseshiah, Deputy Director-General of UNESCO (1963–1970), founder-director of the Madras Institute of Development Studies (MIDS), Vice Chancellor of the University of Madras (1975–78), recipient of the Padma Bhushan award in 2010
- Parvataneni Brahmayya, former president of the Institute of Chartered Accountants of India (ICAI)
- C. Raj Kumar, Founding Vice Chancellor of O. P. Jindal Global University and Founding Dean of Jindal Global Law School
- P. S. Manisundaram, first Principal of the Regional Engineering College (which later became the National Institute of Technology, Tiruchirappalli), the Alagappa Chettiar College of Engineering and Technology (ACGCET-Karaikudi) and the first Vice Chancellor of the Bharathidasan University, Tiruchirappalli
- V. M. Muralidharan, former chairman, Ethiraj College for Women
- K. Thulasiah Vandayar, Secretary and Correspondent of the A.V.V.M Sri Pushpam College and former Member of Parliament
- G. Viswanathan, founder and chancellor of Vellore Institute of Technology

=== Professors and scholars ===
- Srinivas Aravamudan, professor of English and former dean of the humanities at Duke University
- Mrityunjay Athreya, former professor at the Indian Institute of Management, Calcutta, the London Business School and the Strathclyde Business School, Scotland
- Aswath Damodaran, Professor of Finance at the Stern School of Business at New York University
- C. K. Prahalad, Paul and Ruth McCracken Distinguished University Professor of Corporate Strategy at the Stephen M. Ross School of Business at the University of Michigan and distinguished fellow at the William Davidson Institute

== Business ==
- Wenceslaus Anthony, Chairman & managing director of WAML Group, Act Industrial Pty Ltd, recipient of the title, Member of the New Zealand Order of Merit and the Pro Ecclesia et Pontifice
- S. S. Badrinath, founder and chairman emeritus of Sankara Nethralaya, Chennai
- M. Damodaran, IAS, Chairman of IndiGo, former Chairman of the Securities and Exchange Board of India (SEBI), the Industrial Development Bank of India (IDBI) and the Unit Trust of India (UTI)
- R. K. Krishna Kumar, Tata Administrative Services (1963), Trustee of Sir Dorabji Tata Trust and Sir Ratan Tata Trust & Allied Trusts, former Vice Chairman of the Tata Global Beverages and Director of Tata Sons
- Sashi Kumar, founder and promoter of Asianet, chairman of the Asian College of Journalism, Chennai
- Verghese Kurien, Father of the White Revolution, Founder Chairman of the National Dairy Development Board (NDDB) from 1965 to 1998, the Gujarat Co-operative Milk Marketing Federation Ltd (GCMMF), from 1973 to 2006 and the Institute of Rural Management Anand from 1979 to 2006
- N. Mahalingam, former chairman, Sakthi Group and former chairman, Ethiraj College for Women
- Arumugham Mahendran, chairman and managing director of Global Consumer Products Private Limited and former managing director of Godrej Consumer Products Limited
- Bala S. Manian, founder of ReaMetrix, Digital Optics and Quantum Dot Corporation
- Kalanithi Maran, founder and chairman of the SUN Group
- Sudhakar Ram, Group CEO and managing director of Mastek
- Jerry Rao, chairman of the Value and Budget Housing Corporation and founder and former CEO of Mphasis Corporation.
- W Hansraj Saxena, chief executive officer News J, former chief operating officer of Sun Pictures
- Ajit Shetty, former chairman of board of directors, Janssen Pharmaceutica
- Ram Shriram, Forbes billionaire, founding board member of Google Inc. (now Alphabet) and an initial investor in Google, Founder of the Sherpalo Ventures, Menlo Park and board member of the Stanford University.
- A. Sivasailam, former chairman and managing director of Amalgamations Group of Industries
- Damal Kandalai Srinivasan, co-founder of Hindu Mission Hospital, Chennai
- N. Srinivasan, first Chairman of the International Cricket Council, managing director of India Cements Limited
- Rangaswamy Srinivasan, inventor at IBM Research
- Narayanan Vaghul, chairman of the Board of ICICI Bank from 1985 to April 2009, director on the board of Wipro since 1997, member on the Boards of Mahindra World City Developers Limited, Piramal Enterprises Limited, Apollo Hospitals Enterprise Limited, recipient of the Padma Bhushan award in 2010
- Sukesh Daniel, inventor at Servicenow

== Faculty ==
This is a list of notable Loyola College faculty.

- T. N. Ananthakrishnan, joined the Department of Natural Sciences, Loyola College in 1948. Received the Asiatic Society Gold Medal.
- A. W. Rabi Bernard, member of the Parliament of India
- Jerome D'Souza, S.J., Rector and Principal of Loyola College, Chennai from 1942 to 1950, elected to represent Madras legislative assembly at the Constituent Assembly of India from 1946 to 1950, member of the Indian Delegation to the United Nations General Assembly (1949, 1951–1952, 1955, 1957), founder-director of the Indian Social Institute from 1951 to 1956.
- G. Prabha, journalist, Professor of Sanskrit, and director of 'Ishti', the first film in Sanskrit with a social theme
- P. R. Pisharoty, physicist and meteorologist, father of remote sensing in India, founder Director of the Indian Institute of Tropical Meteorology, Pune in 1962, Member of the Scientific Advisory Board of World Meteorological Organization from 1963 to 1968 and later its chairman, emeritus professor at Physical Research Laboratory, recipient of Raman Centenary Medal (1988)

== Film, theatre, and television ==
- Ajesh, singer, music composer
- K. V. Anand, cinematographer and director
- Arulnithi, film actor
- Mahesh Babu, Telugu film actor
- Ramachandra Babu, cinematographer
- Irfan, film actor
- Yuthan Balaji, film actor
- Gabriella Charlton, actor, dancer
- Joe D'Cruz, writer, novelist and documentary film director
- Venkatesh Daggubati, film actor
- Darshana, playback singer
- I. Ahmed, film director and producer
- Kishen Das, actor
- Sam Vishal, singer
- Deepak Dinkar, film and television actor
- Gifton Elias, music composer
- R. Ajay Gnanamuthu film director
- Gokul, film director
- Vinay Govind, film director
- Sikkil Gurucharan, Carnatic musician – vocalist
- Kalidas Jayaram, actor and playback singer
- Ashwin Kakumanu, film actor
- Arvind Krishna, cinematographer, producer and actor
- Anand Krishnamoorthi, film sound designer, sound editor
- Krishna Kulasekaran, film actor
- Jagadeesh Kumar, singer
- Thiagarajan Kumararaja, film director
- Raageshwari Loomba, singer, actress
- Maalavika Manoj, singer
- Richard M. Nathan, cinematographer
- Shanmuga Pandian, film actor
- Suresh Peters, singer, music director, music producer
- Daniel Annie Pope, film actor
- Prashanth, film actor
- Pushkar–Gayathri, director duo
- Karthik Raja, music composer
- Yuvan Shankar Raja, music composer
- Mohan Rajan, lyricist
- K. Rajeshwar, film director
- P. C. Ramakrishna, theatre actor, The Madras Players
- Sunder Ramu, film and stage actor
- Paloma Rao, actress and performer
- Jayam Ravi, film actor
- Radha Ravi, film actor
- Riya Shibu, film actor and producer
- Anirudh Ravichander, music director
- Ruben, film editor
- R. Sarathkumar, film actor
- I. V. Sasi, film director
- Vinayak Sasikumar, lyricist
- Ashok Selvan, film actor
- Silambarasan, film actor, singer, lyricst, film director, music composer
- Sibiraj, film actor
- Johnny Chakravarthy, film actor
- Tatineni Satya, film director
- Rajesh M. Selva, film director and screenwriter
- Soundararajan, cinematographer
- Bhuvan Srinivasan, film editor
- R. Sudharsan, film editor
- Suriya, film actor, producer, founder of the Agaram Foundation
- S. J. Surya, film actor, director, screenwriter, producer, music composer, singer
- Arvind Swami, film actor
- Hiphop Tamizha, (Jeeva) Tamil Hip-hop pioneers
- Vijay Vasanth, actor and managing director of Vasanth & Co
- Arthi Venkatesh, actress
- Vetrimaaran, film director, producer and writer
- John Vijay, film actor
- Vikram, film actor
- Siddharth Vipin, music composer
- Vishal, film actor, producer and anti-piracy activist
- Vishnuvardhan, film director
- Josh Vivian, singer, music composer

== Journalism ==
- Kasturi Balaji, managing director of The Hindu
- S. S. Balan, former chairman emeritus of the Vikatan Group
- Vincent D'Souza, editor and publisher of The Mylapore Times and The Arcot Road Times
- Manu Joseph, former editor of OPEN magazine, and a columnist for The International New York Times and The Hindustan Times
- Narasimhan Murali, co-chairman, Kasturi & Sons Ltd., Proprietors of The Hindu Group of Publications
- Sanjay Pinto, Indian lawyer, former bureau chief and resident editor, NDTV 24 X 7
- N. Ram, chairman, The Hindu Publishing Group (THG); former Editor-in-Chief, The Hindu Group of Publications
- N. S. Ramaswami, Indian sports journalist and former assistant editor of The Hindu, Mail and Indian Express
- Palagummi Sainath, former rural affairs editor of The Hindu, founder editor of the People's Archive of Rural India and recipient of the Ramon Magsaysay Award

== Law and politics ==
=== Heads of state and Heads of government ===
- Daniel Lisulo, third Prime Minister of Zambia
- C. Joseph Vijay, 9th Chief Minister of Tamil Nadu
- Ramaswamy Venkataraman, Eighth President of India, Indian independence activist, and member of the Constituent Assembly of India

=== Supreme Court Judges ===
- Jasti Chelameswar, former judge of the Supreme Court of India
- K. M. Joseph, retired judge of the Supreme Court of India
- M. M. Sundresh, sitting judge of the Supreme Court of India

=== High Court Judges ===
- Kumar Rajarathnam, Chief Justice of the Madhya Pradesh High Court
- R Sudhakar, Chief Justice of the Manipur High Court
- Sundaram Nainar Sundaram, Chief justice of Gujarat and Telangana High Court.

=== Governors ===
- M. O. Hasan Farook Maricar, former Chief minister of Pondicherry, former Governor of Kerala
- M. K. Narayanan, former National Security Adviser of India, Director of Intelligence Bureau, the Governor of West Bengal and he also played a significant role in the negotiation of the India–United States Civil Nuclear Agreement

=== Other political figures ===
- P. Chidambaram, Member of Parliament, former Finance Minister, Government of India
- T R B Rajaa, MLA- TN Assembly, Chairman of Tamil Nadu Estimates Committee, Secretary of DMK IT Wing.
- B. S. Gnanadesikan, president of the Tamil Nadu Congress Committee [TNCC]
- A. P. Shanmugasundara Goundar, former Member of the Legislative Assembly, Tamil Nadu
- P. J. Joseph, Member of Legislative Assembly, Minister, Government of Kerala
- Jose K. Mani, Member of Parliament, chairman of Kerala Congress (M) party
- Udhayanidhi Stalin, Son of M. K. Stalin, former Deputy CM of Tamil Nadu
- Dayanidhi Maran, Member of Parliament, former Minister of Communications and Information Technology, Government of India
- J. Shivashanmugam Pillai, first speaker of Madras Legislative Assembly (1946 -1955), first Scheduled Caste mayor of Madras
- V. Vaithilingam, former Chief minister of Pondicherry
- K. Thulasiah Vandayar, former Member of Parliament, Secretary and Correspondent of the A.V.V.M Sri Pushpam College
- P. Wilson, Member of Parliament and former Additional Solicitor General of India

=== Civil servants ===
- F. V. Arul, IPS, second Director of Central Bureau of Investigation (CBI)
- K. Sankaran Nair, Imperial Police, former Director of the Research and Analysis Wing (R&AW)
- Ronald Carlton Vivian Piadade Noronha, Indian Civil Service, second and fifth Chief Secretary of Madhya Pradesh state (1963–68, 1972–74), RCVP Noronha Academy of Administration & Management (RCVP), premier training institution of M.P. Government is named after him
- B. Raman, IPS, former head of the counter-terrorism division of the Research and Analysis Wing (R&AW)
- Pattabhi Sundar Raman, former advocate-general of Tamil Nadu
- C. Rangarajan, 19th Governor of the Reserve Bank of India and Chairman of the Prime Minister's Economic Advisory Council
- V. K. Rao, Indian Civil Service, Principal Secretary to the President of India, Neelam Sanjiva Reddy
- V. Selvaraj, IAS, Chairman of Madras Port Trust and Industries Secretary of the Government of Tamil Nadu
- C. G. Somiah, IAS, former Comptroller and Auditor General of India
- S. Sripal, IPS, former Director general of police, Tamil Nadu State
- N. Vittal, IAS, former Central Vigilance Commissioner
- Beno Zephine, first 100% visually challenged Indian Foreign Service Officer
- Akbar Mirza Khaleeli, former Indian ambassador to Iran, Italy and High Commissioner to Australia

=== Social workers ===
- P. K. Gopal, International President of the International Association for Integration, Dignity and Economic Advancement of people affected by leprosy (IDEA), first Chairman of the National Forum of Persons affected by Leprosy (now Association of People affected by Leprosy), recipient of the Padma Shri award in 2012.
- Joe Madiath, Social Entrepreneur, founder and chairman of Gram Vikas, a non-governmental organisation based in Orissa, recipient of Water Champion Award from Asian Development Bank and Social Life Time Achievement Award by Godfrey Phillips National Bravery Awards in 2006

== Religion ==
- Archbishop Joseph Powathil, Archbishop emeritus of Archdiocese of Changanacherry.
- Duraisamy Simon Cardinal Lourdusamy, Prefect Emeritus of the Congregation for the Oriental Churches
- Swami Parthasarathy, philosopher and exponent of Vedanta
- Chidananda Saraswati, President of the Divine Life Society, Rishikesh, India

== Science, technology, medicine, and mathematics ==
- Geetha Angara, first woman to be awarded a master's in chemistry by the university, receiving a gold medal in the process for graduating at the top of the class. Victim of an unsolved 2005 homicide in the U.S.
- Narayanan Chandrakumar, professor emeritus at IIT Madras, founder of the first Nuclear magnetic resonance (NMR) laboratory in India, Shanti Swarup Bhatnagar laureate
- Ranjan Roy Daniel, former Dean, School of Physics and Senior Professor at Tata Institute of Fundamental Research, Bombay, Scientific Secretary of the Committee on Science and Technology in Developing Countries (COSTED) from 1988 to 1995, Chairman of ISRO's National Committee on Middle Atmosphere Research (1989) and Advisory Committee on Space Sciences (1981–88), founder member of Indian Physics Association and Astronomical Society of India, founder Chairman of the Bombay Association for Science Education, Fellow of IAS, INSA, TWAS, recipient of the Padma Bhushan award in 1992 and COSPAR International Cooperation Medal in 1994
- M. S. Narasimhan, Fellow of the Royal Society, London, Honorary Fellow of the Tata Institute of Fundamental Research, Head of the Mathematics group at the International Centre for Theoretical Physics, Trieste, derived Narasimhan–Seshadri theorem and recipient of the King Faisal International Prize for Science
- Kadiyala Ramachandra, former head of the department of medicine at Madras Medical College and established the Department of Oncology & Cancer Chemotherapy and the Rheumatic Care Unit at the Government General Hospital, Chennai
- Ramakrishna Ramaswamy, visiting professor at IIT Delhi, former president of the Indian Academy of Sciences, Bangalore, Vice President of the Indian National Science Academy, New Delhi and Vice Chancellor of the University of Hyderabad
- C. P. Ramanujam, known for number theory and algebraic geometry (Ramanujam–Samuel theorem, Ramanujam vanishing theorem), a mathematics student of Father Charles Racine
- Natesan Rangabashyam, established Ostomy Department in 1978 at Madras Medical College and Government General Hospital, Chennai, introduced the first M.Ch. (Surgical Gastroenterology) course in India in 1984, Honorary Surgeon to the President of India, R Venkataraman, Fellow of the Association of Surgeons of Great Britain and Ireland, National Academy of Medical Sciences, Academy of Medicine, Singapore and the recipient of Padma Bhushan in 2002 and Dr B C Roy National Award twice
- Paul Ratnasamy, catalyst scientist, former director of the CSIR-National Chemical Laboratory, Pune
- Ravi Sankaran, ornithologist, former Director of the Salim Ali Centre for Ornithology and Natural History
- Lakshmanan Sathyavagiswaran, former Chief Medical Examiner-Coroner for the County of Los Angeles
- C. S. Seshadri, Fellow of the Royal Society, London, founder and Director-Emeritus of the Chennai Mathematical Institute, derived Narasimhan–Seshadri theorem, the Seshadri constant is named after him, recipient of Padma Bhushan and Shanti Swarup Bhatnagar Prize for Science and Technology
- Veeravalli S. Varadarajan, professor emeritus and Distinguished Research Professor at the Department of Mathematics, University of California, Los Angeles (UCLA), Trombi–Varadarajan theorem, a mathematics student of K.A. Adivarahan in 1950

== Sport ==
- Viswanathan Anand, Five time World Chess Champion and winner of multiple International Chess tournaments
- Vijay Amritraj, tennis player
- Vasudevan Baskaran, captain of India men's national field hockey team, which won the gold medal at the 1980 Summer Olympics in Moscow, Soviet Union
- Mohammad Ghouse, cricket umpire and former Chairman of the Tamil Nadu Cricket Association
- Sunny Gupta, cricketer
- Jawad Hussain, first class cricket player (father of the former England captain, Nasir Hussain)
- Sharath Kamal, Indian table tennis player
- Ramanathan Krishnan, tennis player
- Ramesh Krishnan, tennis player
- Vidya Pillai, first Indian female snooker player to reach the finals of the WLBSA World Women's Snooker Championship
- Ramkumar Ramanathan, tennis player
- A. G. Kripal Singh, first class cricketer for Tamil Nadu
- A. G. Milkha Singh, cricketer
- Sivabalan, volleyball player
- Krishnamoorthy Vignesh, cricketer
- Sanjay Yadav, cricketer
- Tinu Yohannan, cricketer
- Edwin Sydney Vanspaul, footballer

== Other ==
- S. Nandagopal, sculptor and painter and member of the Madras Art Movement
- Sidney Sladen, fashion designer
- Anukreethy Vas, Femina Miss India World 2018
- Tenzin Tsundue, Tibetan writer and activist
