= Brahmayya =

Brahmayya or Brahmaiah (Telugu: బ్రహ్మయ్య) is an Indian name and may refer to:

- Gottipati Brahmayya (1889–1984), Indian freedom fighter
- Parvataneni Brahmayya (1908–1980), chartered accountant and founder Brahmayya & Co.

== See also ==
- P. Brahmayya Sastry, Indian professor of physiology
- Kasibhatta Brahmaiah Sastry (1863–1940), Sanskrit and Telugu scholar
