= V. Jayaraman =

Indian politician

Deputy Speaker of the Tamil Nadu Legislative Assembly
- In office 10 October 2012 – 2 May 2021
- Speaker: P. Dhanapal
- Preceded by: P. Dhanapal
- Succeeded by: K. Pitchandi

Minister for Food & Civil Supplies and Cooperation (Tamil Nadu)
- In office 2004–2006
- Chief Minister: J. Jayalalithaa

Minister for Industries and Environment (Tamil Nadu)
- In office 14 May 2001 – 21 September 2001
- Chief Minister: J. Jayalalithaa
- Preceded by: I. Periyasamy
- Succeeded by: Himself
- In office 21 September 2001 – 3 March 2002
- Chief Minister: O. Panneerselvam
- Preceded by: Himself
- Succeeded by: Nainar Nagendran

Member of the Tamil Nadu Legislative Assembly
- In office 19 May 2016 – 6 May 2026
- Preceded by: M. K. Muthukaruppannasamy
- Succeeded by: K. Nithyanandan
- Constituency: Pollachi
- In office 14 May 2011 – 12 May 2016
- Preceded by: C. Shanmugavelu
- Succeeded by: Udumalai K. Radhakrishnan
- Constituency: Udumalaipettai
- In office May 2001 – May 2011
- Preceded by: S. Raju
- Succeeded by: M. K. Muthukaruppannasamy
- Constituency: Pollachi

Personal details
- Born: 2 July 1952 (age 74) Thippampatti, Pollachi
- Spouse(s): Bhagyalakshmi, Jothilakshmi
- Children: 6
- Education: M.A., M. Phil., Ph. D.
- Occupation: Agriculture, Industrialist, Politician, Social Worker

Pollachi Varadharaj Jayaraman, better known as Pollachi V. Jayaraman or V. Jayaraman, is an Indian politician and a member of the Tamil Nadu Legislative Assembly from the Pollachi constituency. He was previously selected from Pollachi constituency (2001-2006), (2006-2011) respectively and elected from constituency (2011-2016) and (2016-2021). He was Minister in the 2nd Jayalalithaa government as Minister for Industries, Environment, Pollution Control (2001-2002), and again as Minister for Food, Civil Supplies and Co-operative (2004-2006). He is one among the 3 MLAs from ADMK to record winning 5 times consecutively in assembly elections from 2001 onwards from Pollachi and Udumalpet constituencies with others being O.Pannerselvam and K.P.Anbazhagan. Jayaraman also won the Tamil Nadu State Assembly elections held in May 2021 from the same constituency.
