= Madras Medical College =

Medical school and hospital in Chennai, India

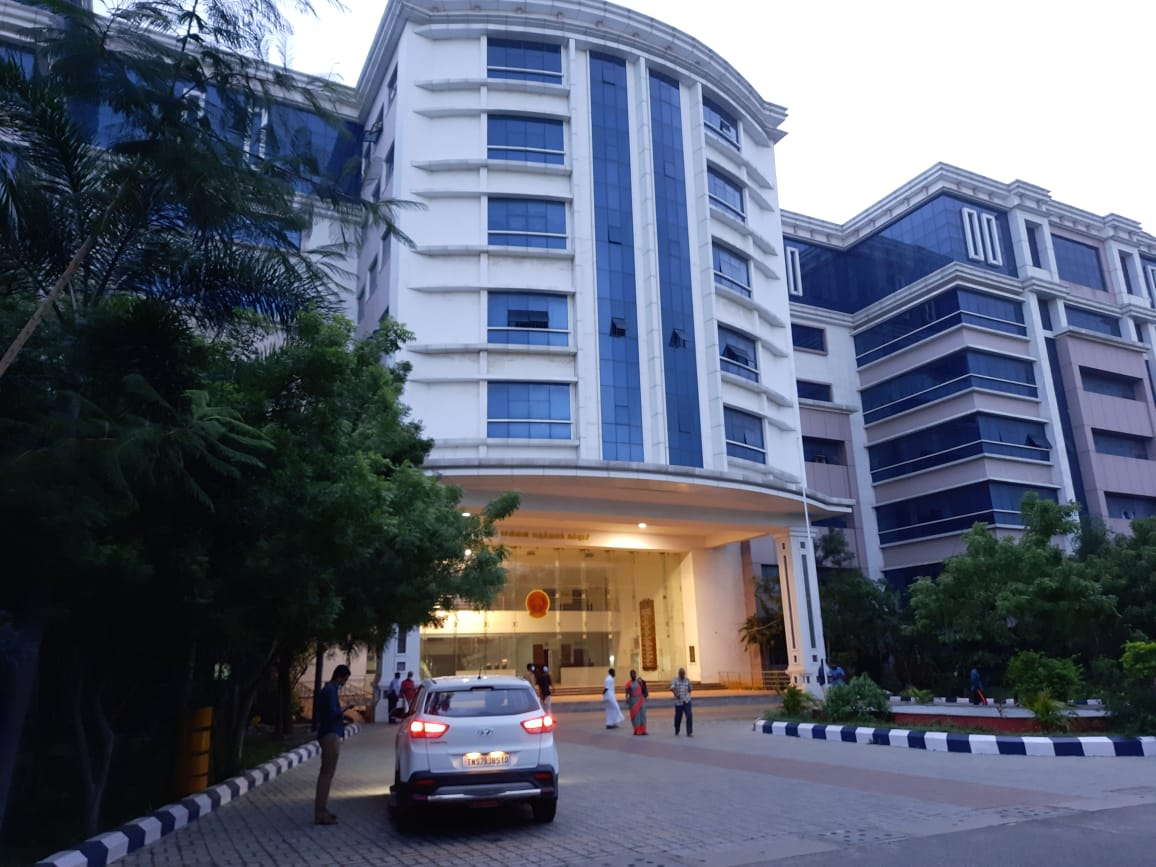
- The main building of MMC, Chennai
- Motto: Learn To Heal
- Type: Public medical college
- Established: February 13, 1835; 191 years ago
- Affiliations: Tamil Nadu Dr. M.G.R. Medical University
- Dean: K. Shantharam
- Location: Chennai, India; 13.081621°N 80.278865°E
- Website: www.mmcrgggh.tn.gov.in/ords/r/wsmmc/mmc12055555/home

Madras Medical College (MMC) is a public medical college located in Chennai, Tamil Nadu, India. Established in 1835, it is one of the oldest medical colleges in India, as well as in Asia.

== History ==
The Government General Hospital was established on 16 November 1647 to treat soldiers of the British East India Company. Madras Medical College was established on 2 February 1835. Mary Scharlieb graduated from Madras Medical College in 1878.

In 1996, when the metropolis of Madras was renamed as Chennai, the name of the college also changed to Chennai Medical College. It was later re-renamed back to the Madras Medical College since the college was known worldwide by the older name.

The foundation stone for the new building of the college was laid by the then Chief Minister of Tamil Nadu, M. Karunanidhi, on 28 February 2010.

In January 2011, the hospital was renamed as Rajiv Gandhi Government General Hospital.

== Red Fort building ==
A red-brick heritage structure known as the "Red Fort" stands to the east of the MMC buildings. Built in 1897, it has been classified as a Grade I heritage building by the Justice E. Padmanabhan Committee on heritage structures. It housed the anatomy department for several decades, which was partially moved to the new campus of the MMC at the erstwhile Central Prison campus in 2013.

In December 2017, the PWD started the restoration of the heritage structure at a cost of ₹ 19.7 million. Once restored, the structure will be converted to a museum, with the ground floor showcasing the history of MMC and the first-floor showcasing specimens for comparative anatomy.

== New campus ==
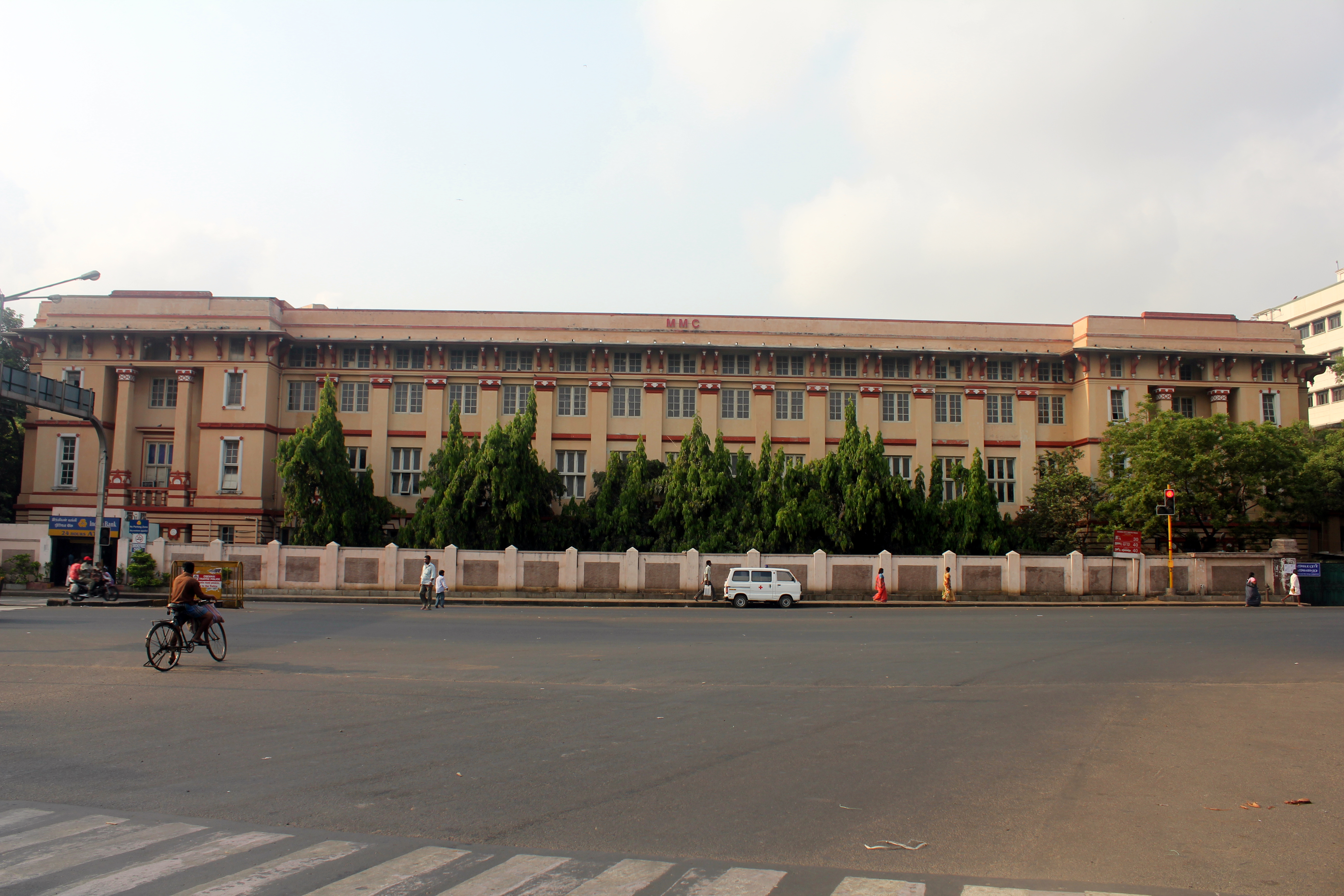
MMC's main building

A new campus with a six-storeyed building for Madras Medical College was built on land covering 325,000 square feet (30,200 m^{2}) on the erstwhile central prison premises in 2010 and was completed in 2012. The campus has nearly 1,250 students and 400 faculty and staff members. The campus was built at a cost of ₹ 566.3 million and started functioning in 2013.

The old MMC buildings presently house the college of pharmacy, school of nursing and also accommodate students of the recently added courses of audiology, speech learning and pathology, radiotherapy and radio diagnosis.

== Affiliation ==
Since 1857, the college has been affiliated to the University of Madras and all degrees of Health Sciences were awarded by the same until 1988 when the Tamil Nadu Dr. M.G.R. Medical University Act, 1987 received the assent of the president of India. This affiliating university started functioning from July 1988 and is governed by the said Act.

The college was declared as an independent university called the Madras Medical College and Research Institute (MMC & RI). Later the status as an independent university was withdrawn shortly afterwards and the college was affiliated back to the Tamil Nadu Dr. M.G.R. Medical University, dropping the suffix: "Research Institute" in 2000.

== Affiliated institutions ==
- Rajiv Gandhi Government General Hospital (RGGGH), Park Town, Chennai – 600003
- Tamil Nadu Government Dental College, Park Town, Chennai - 600003
- College of Pharmacy, Park Town, Chennai - 600003
- Barnard Institute of Radiology, Park Town, Chennai - 600003
- Institute of Mental Health, Kilpauk, Chennai - 600010
- Institute of Obstetrics and Gynaecology and Government Hospital for Women and Children (IOG & GH WC), Egmore, Chennai - 600008
- Institute of Social Obstetrics and Government Kasturba Gandhi Hospital for Women and Children, Triplicane, Chennai-600005
- Omandurar government medical college hospital, Chennai-600002
- Institute of Child Health and Government Hospital for Children (ICH & HC), Egmore, Chennai - 600008
- Regional Institute of Ophthalmology and Government Ophthalmic Hospital, Chennai (RIOGOH), Egmore, Chennai - 600008
- Government Institute of Rehabilitation Medicine, K.K. Nagar, Chennai - 600083
- Institute of Thoracic Medicine and Chest Diseases, Chetpet, Chennai - 600031
- National Institute of Aging, Guindy, Chennai -600032
- Government Peripheral Hospital, Periyar Nagar, Chennai
- Communicable Diseases Hospital (CDH), Tondiarpet, Chennai - 600081

== Rankings ==
University and college rankings

Medical – India
- NIRF (2024): 11

Pharmacy – India
- NIRF (2024): 74

In 2025, Madras Medical College, Chennai secured 16th place among medical institutions in India by the National Institutional Ranking Framework (NIRF).

The College was ranked 10th and 78th in India by the National Institutional Ranking Framework (NIRF) in the medical and pharmacy ranking respectively in 2024.

== Cultural events ==
Madras Medical college hosts inter-college cultural extravaganza known as "REVIVALS" and the annual inter-medical sports meet known as "ENCIERRO". Apart from this, it also hosts annual intra college cultural event known by the name " KALAIOMA". GENESIS is the intercollegiate academic conference conducted for undergraduate medical students since 2005. The 17th event of genesis will be held in the month of September 2023.

== Administration ==
The college and hospital are funded and managed by the state government of Tamil Nadu. The head of the institution is the dean followed by the vice-principal.

- Dean of institution: K.Shantharaman
- Vice-Principal: J. Sreevidya

== Notable people ==
=== Alumni ===
- Ayyathan Gopalan - First Indian Superintendent of Calicut lunatic asylum (Kuthiravattom mental hospital), Chief Surgeon, Medical Professor, Social reformer of Kerala (Founder of Sugunavardhini movement, Depressed Classes Mission and leader and Propagandist of Brahmo Samaj in Kerala).
- Lakshmi Sahgal, Indian freedom fighter and member of the Indian National Army
- Ayyathan Janaki Ammal - First female doctor and Surgeon of Kerala, First Malayali Lady doctor and Surgeon.
- Mukhtar Ahmed Ansari, surgeon and President of the Indian National Congress (1927)
- Padmanabhan Palpu, physician from the Kingdom of Travancore who served as a chief medical officer of Mysore State.
- A. N. Chandrasekaran, rheumatologist and recipient of the Dr. B. C. Roy Award. Founded the first dedicated department for rheumatology in India and the Journal of Indian Rheumatology Association.
- S. S. Badrinath, ophthalmologist, founder of Sankara Nethralaya
- C.O. Karunakaran, bacteriologist and founder of Government Medical College, Thiruvananthapuram
- V. Mohan, diabetologist and Padma Shri recipient
- Guruswami Mudaliar, a noted professor at MMC and doctor in Madras
- G. M. Yahya, Former Dean of Thanjavur Medical College.
- Arjunan Rajasekaran, urologist and a recipient of the Padma Shri and Dr. B. C. Roy Award
- JS Rajkumar, founder Lifeline group of hospitals, Chennai. Advanced laparoscopic surgeon, former president Association of Surgeons of India (ASI) TN& P chapter
- Kadiyala Ramachandra, professor of medicine and Padma Shri recipient
- Anbumani Ramadoss, former Union health minister
- Natesan Rangabashyam, Gastroenterologist and Padma Bhushan recipient
- Muthulakshmi Reddi, one of the first female doctors in India
- Yellapragada Subbarow, known for the synthesis of the first ever chemotherapeutic drug aminopterin, and subsequently methotrexate. He is also known for the synthesis of folic acid and diethylcarbamazine and the purification of adenosine triphosphate and creatine.
- Tamilisai Soundararajan, former Governor of Telangana.
- C. U. Velmurugendran, Neurologist and Padma Shri recipient
- Abraham Verghese, physician, teacher, author and recipient of the U.S. National Humanities Medal
- Raman Viswanathan, chest physician and Padma Bhushan recipient
- Sivapatham Vittal, endocrine surgeon and a recipient of the Padma Shri and Dr. B. C. Roy Award
- P. K. R. Warrier, cardiothoracic surgeon, author and social activist
- Madanur Ahmed Ali, Indian surgical gastroenterologist from Chennai
- V. Maitreyan, Member of Parliament (Rajyasabha)
- Venkatesan Sangareddi - Former professor of cardiology, and chief civil surgeon of Madras medical college, is one of the long serving faculty in the Department of cardiology for nearly 30 years. His academic work "Expressions in Cardiology," is being published in www.drsvenkatesan.com, as an online cardiology learning resource. The work is globally recognized and stands in top 10 cardiology blogs, attracting 6 million visitors from over 160 countries. He is also the author of A Handbook of "Nobel Laureates in medicine" an Inspirational Journey in the annals of medical science.

=== Faculty ===
- Subramanian Kalyanaraman, neurosurgeon, Shanti Swarup Bhatnagar Prize laureate
- T. S. Kanaka, Asia's first female neurosurgeon
