= Sujatha Mohan (doctor) =

Indian eye doctor

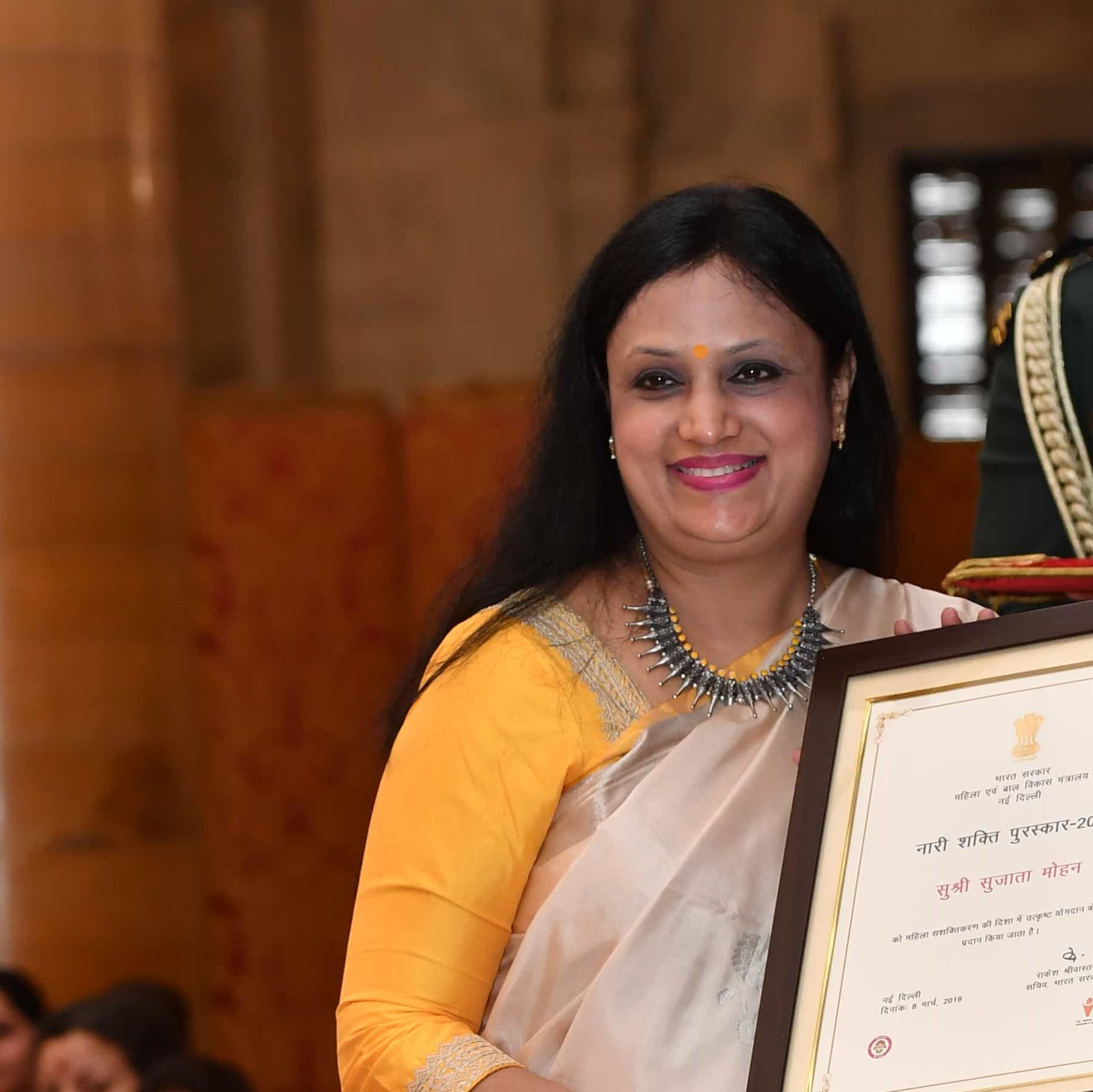
- Born: 20th century

Sujatha Mohan is an Indian eye doctor. She is based in Chennai and she has been recognised with a Nari Shakti Puraskar award for philanthropic work supplying free eye care in the region of Chennai.

== Life ==
Sujatha studied at an eye hospital, Sankara Nethralaya, in Chennai, India. While there she met her future husband in 1986 and they married the following year.

She is the executive medical director of the Rajan Eye Care Hospital. The hospital has a charitable section named the Chennai Vision Charitable Trust which aims to supply operations that can improve sight in southern India. The trust has created 3,500 eye screening operations within 150 kilometres (93 mi) of their base in Chennai including Kanchipuram, Tiruvallur, Tiruvannamalai, Vellore, and Villupuram. They have tested the eyes of a million people and this has resulted in over 100,000 cataract operations, 7,000 corneal transplants and the supply of 300,000 pairs of glasses. The cataract operations have involved the implantation of lens within the patient's eyes and this service has been provided at no cost to the patients. This was achieved with the help of the Rotary Club who funded the corneal eye transplants and a van which is equipped so that they can conduct eye operations within the vehicle.

Sujatha was awarded the Nari Shakti Puraskar on 8 March 2019. The 2018 award was made in the Presidential Palace by the President of India on International Women's Day.

== Personal life ==
They met a few times for meals and the cinema before their parents met on 26 January 1987. They approved and they married on 19 August 1987. They have two daughters.
