= K. Nithyanandhan =

Indian politician

Member of the Tamil Nadu Legislative Assembly
- Incumbent
- Assumed office 11 May 2026
- Preceded by: Pollachi V. Jayaraman
- Constituency: Pollachi

Personal details
- Party: Dravida Munnetra Kazhagam
- Profession: Politician

K. Nithyanandhan is an Indian politician from Tamil Nadu. He is a member of the Tamil Nadu Legislative Assembly from Pollachi representing the Dravida Munnetra Kazhagam.

== Early life and education ==
Nithyanandhan is from Coimbatore district in Tamil Nadu. He is an agriculturalist and businessman. He completed a Bachelor of Engineering degree in Mechanical Engineering from Kongu Engineering College, affiliated with Bharathiar University, Coimbatore, in 1994.

== Political career ==
Nithyanandhan won the Pollachi seat in the 2026 Tamil Nadu Legislative Assembly election as a candidate of the Dravida Munnetra Kazhagam. He received 62,013 votes and defeated V. Jayaraman of the All India Anna Dravida Munnetra Kazhagam by a margin of 4,627 votes.
