= Anthony De Sa =

Anthony De Sa may refer:

- Anthony De Sa (author), Canadian novelist and short story writer
- Anthony de Sa (civil servant), Indian retired civil servant
- Anthony De Sa (actor), Indian actor, playwright, theatre director, singer, and composer
