= A. N. Chandrasekaran =

20th-century Indian doctor and philanthropist

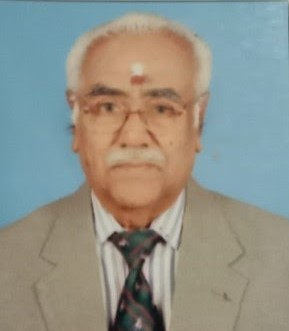
- Dr Chandasekaran, in 2020
- Born: Arungundram Nagarajan Chandrasekaran; 15 October 1938 (age 87); Rammayapet, Andhra Pradesh, India
- Education: Madras Medical College
- Occupations: Rheumatologist; philanthropist
- Awards: APLAR Master Award (2020); Dr. B. C. Roy Award (1992); R.E.A.C.H Foundation Heritage Award (2011)
- Scientific career
- Fields: Rheumatology; immunology; social medicine
- Military career
- Allegiance: India
- Branch: Indian Army
- Service years: 1963–c. 1965
- Rank: Captain
- Unit: Army Medical Corps
- Conflicts: Indo-Pakistani War
- Awards: Raksha Medal; Samar Seva Star; Sainya Seva Medal

A. N. Chandrasekaran (born Arungundram Nagarajan Chandrasekaran in 1938, in Rammayapet, Andhra Pradesh) is an Indian doctor and philanthropist from Chennai, India.

== Early years and military career ==
Chandrasekaran was born on 15 October 1938 as Arungundram Nagarajan Chandrasekaran in Rammayapet, Andhra Pradesh. He joined the Madras Medical College and completed his MBBS in 1962. In 1963, he joined the Army Medical Corps and served in the aftermath of the Indo-Chinese War of 1962 and through the Indo-Pakistani War in 1965 in Jammu and Kashmir and Ladakh as a part of the 8th Gorkha Rifles regiment. Attaining the rank of Captain, for his service Chandrasekaran was awarded the Raksha Medal, Samar Seva Star, and the Sainya Seva Medal.

== Medical career ==
In 1972, Chandrasekaran pioneered the first dedicated Department of Rheumatology in India at Madras Medical College and subsequently developed into an advanced training institute that has produced more than fifty Doctor of Medicine graduates and six PhD scholars who subsequently created rheumatology departments and studies across India. He has published more than 300 peer-reviewed articles on rheumatology and, in 1994, launched the Journal of Indian Rheumatism Association (JIRA), the first scientific journal dedicated to rheumatology in India. In 1997 he was elected Fellow of the Indian National Academy of Medical Sciences (FNAMS).

In 1993, Chandrasekaran conducted some of the earliest medical studies done under the direction of the World Health Organization showing the efficacy of traditional Indian Ayurvedic medicine for the treatment of rheumatoid arthritis.

He successfully sued the Government of Tamil Nadu for discrimination and was, in 2012, awarded by the Madras High Court the position of the Director of Medical and Rural Health Services, the highest medical posting in state of Tamil Nadu.

== Philanthropy ==
Apart from his contributions to medicine, Chandrasekaran was involved in the philanthropic development of rural India. In 2011 he established a maternity hospital in Arungundram along with his earlier establishments of a primary school, a public library, and community center. He was also credited with discovering and restoring a 1200-year-old ancient temple from c. 850 – c. 900 CE or earlier for which he was awarded the R.E.A.C.H. Foundation Award by Academy of Archaeology and Sciences of Ancient India (AASAI).

== Awards ==
In addition to his military awards, among the awards conferred on Chandrasekaran include:

- Dr. B.C. Roy Award, Highest award for medical excellence in India (1992)
- Lifetime Achievement Award from the Indian Rheumatism Association (2005)
- Lifetime Achievement Award from the Madras Medical College (2010)
- R.E.A.C.H Foundation Heritage award (2011)
- Lifetime Achievement Award from the Tamil Nadu Dr. MGR Medical University (2011)
- Lifetime Achievement Award from the King George's Medical University, Lucknow (2013)
- Honorary Doctorate from MGR Medical University (2013)
- Asia Pacific League of Associations for Rheumatology Master Award (2020)
