= N. Mahalingam =

Indian businessman

Mahalingam Nachimuthu

Member of the Madras Legislative Assembly
- In office 1952 – 1957 Serving with P. K. Thirumurthy
- Preceded by: Office established
- Succeeded by: Himself & K. Ponniah
- Constituency: Pollachi
- In office 1957 – 1962 Serving with K. Ponniah
- Preceded by: Himself & P. K. Thirumurthy
- Succeeded by: Himself
- Constituency: Pollachi
- In office 1962 – 1967
- Preceded by: Himself & K. Ponniah
- Succeeded by: A. P. Shanmugasundara Goundar
- Constituency: Pollachi

Personal details
- Born: 21 March 1923 Pollachi, Coimbatore
- Died: 2 October 2014 (aged 91) Chennai, Tamil Nadu, India
- Education: Loyola College, Chennai College of Engineering, Guindy
- Profession: Industrialist; educationist; politician; philanthropist

Nachimuthu Mahalingam (21 March 1923 – 2 October 2014) known by many as Pollachi N. Mahalingam was an Indian educationist, industrialist, philanthropist and prominent person from Tamil Nadu. He was the chairman of the Sakthi Group, and Ethiraj College for Women between 1972 and 1980.

== Early life and education ==
He was born to an agricultural family, completed his B.Sc. in physics from Loyola College, Chennai. Mahalingam was married to Mariyammal. The couple had three sons, Manickam, Balasubramaniam, and Srinivaasan; and a daughter, Karunambal Vanavarayar.

== Politics ==
Since his father Thiru P. Nachimuthu, was a municipal chairman, Mahalingam showed interest into politics at an early age. He was elected as the member of the Madras Legislative Assembly in 1952 as an Indian National Congress candidate for the first time at the age of 29. He was elected as a member for the same constituency in the consecutive elections 1956 and 1962. During his tenure, he provided Parambikulam-Aliyar project and various schemes for the welfare of Pollachi Constituency.

He served on the board of directors for several public sector undertakings and the State Planning Commission in two terms.

In 1967 Indian general election he was defeated by K. Ramani of CPM in Coimbatore Lok Sabha constituency.

== Career ==
Mahalingam joined the Sakthi Group business in 1943. After the banks were nationalised by the then Prime Minister Indira Gandhi, Mahalingam began businesses and expanded, as more and more banks were ready to lend money easily. Today, the Sakthi Group has forayed into sugar, distilling, automobiles, and finance.

Mahalingam is the founder of many educational institutions, including Kumaraguru College of Technology, Nachimuthu Polytechnic College, Sakthi Polytechnic College and Dr. Mahalingam College of Engineering and Technology. He was involved in the establishment of Institute of Asian Studies in Madras in 1981.

== Honours and titles ==
Year	Award	Issued by	Ref.
2007	Padma Bhushan	Government of India	
1989–92	Honorary Consul	Government of Mauritius	
1989	Indira Gandhi National Integration Award	All India National Unity Conference, New Delhi	
1983	Aram Valarkkum Annal	Sri Sankaracharya of Kanchi Kamakodi Peedam	
1984	Doctor of Laws	Bharathiar University, Coimbatore	
1988	Doctor of Science	Anna University, Madras	
2000	Doctor of Science	Tamil Nadu Agricultural University, Coimbatore	

== Spiritual life ==
Mahalingam had an important association with Sri Swami Satchidananda, the Indian swamiji who emigrated to the United Statesand founded the Integral Yoga Institutes.and who has faced multiple sexual misconduct allegations Mahalingham was a devoted follower of the Swamiji and contributed to the moral and financial causes of the Swamiji's works in the US, especially to the Light of Truth Universal Shrine (LOTUS) ecumenical temple in Virginia.

Mahalingam was also greatly associated with Vethathiri Maharishi and his teachings. He donated land for Temple of consciousness - Aliyar.

== Death ==
Mahalingam died of a heart attack in 2014 while speaking at a celebration in Chennai.
