= JS Rajkumar =

Indian hospital founder

JS Rajkumar is the founder of Lifeline Group of Hospitals and is known to have set up the first Stem Cell Unit in Chennai, India. Rajkumar graduated from Madras Medical College and after his post graduation trained in the United Kingdom under senior surgeons on advanced general surgery and hepato-biliary and pancreatic surgery.

He has been conferred with the Vaidya Ratna Award from President Abdul Kalam. Rajkumar’s compilation of poems and short stories has been published as a book titled Scalpel Scribbles.

Rajkumar was the first Indian surgeon who performed air surgery live with the use of Google Glass. The surgery performed was upper gastro-intestinal laparoscopy on a 45 year old man. The complete procedure was live streamed for doctors, surgeons, medical students and press who were sitting outside operating field 500 meters away. Though this process was used abroad frequently but in India was performed for the first time in 2013.

Rajkumar, along with a few other doctors, helped save the life of a 46-year-old surgeon on board a Kolkata-Chennai flight. The surgeon fell unconscious and lost pulse and was revived using the technique of Cardio Pulmonary Resuscitation (CPR). He removed six-kg tumour from abdomen of 55 year old man with the help of his team of doctors at Lifeline Hospital Chennai.

He has been the Chairman of the Association of Surgeons of India, TN&P chapter for the year 2011-12.
