= Pollachi Assembly constituency =

One of the 234 State Legislative Assembly Constituencies in Tamil Nadu, in India

Coordinates: 10.659°N 77.008°E

Pollachi
- Constituency No. 123 for the Tamil Nadu Legislative Assembly

Constituency details
- Country: India
- Region: South India
- State: Tamil Nadu
- District: Coimbatore
- Lok Sabha constituency: Pollachi
- Established: 1951
- Total electors: 2,04,008
- Reservation: None

Member of Legislative Assembly
- 17th Tamil Nadu Legislative Assembly
- Incumbent K. Nithyanandhan
- Party: DMK
- Alliance: SPA
- Elected year: 2026

Pollachi is the legislative assembly in Coimbatore district, which includes the city of Pollachi. Its State Assembly Constituency number is 123. This assembly constituency is a part of Pollachi Lok Sabha constituency. It is one of the 234 State Legislative Assembly Constituencies in Tamil Nadu, in India.

== Members of Legislative Assembly ==
Year	Member	Political party
Madras State
1952	N. Mahalingam	Indian National Congress
1952	P. K. Thirumurthy	Indian National Congress
1957	K. Ponniah	Indian National Congress
1957	N. Mahalingam	Indian National Congress
1962	N. Mahalingam	Indian National Congress
1967	A. P. S. Gounder	Dravida Munnetra Kazhagam
Tamil Nadu
1971	A. P. S. Gounder	Dravida Munnetra Kazhagam
1977	O. P. Somasundaram	All India Anna Dravida Munnetra Kazhagam
1980	M. V. Rathinam	All India Anna Dravida Munnetra Kazhagam
1984	M. V. Rathinam	All India Anna Dravida Munnetra Kazhagam
1989	V. P. Chandrasekar	All India Anna Dravida Munnetra Kazhagam
1991	V. P. Chandrasekar	All India Anna Dravida Munnetra Kazhagam
1996	S. Raju	Dravida Munnetra Kazhagam
2001	Pollachi V. Jayaraman	All India Anna Dravida Munnetra Kazhagam
2006	Pollachi V. Jayaraman	All India Anna Dravida Munnetra Kazhagam
2011	M. K. Muthukaruppannasamy	All India Anna Dravida Munnetra Kazhagam
2016	Pollachi V. Jayaraman	All India Anna Dravida Munnetra Kazhagam
2021	Pollachi V. Jayaraman	All India Anna Dravida Munnetra Kazhagam
2026	K. Nithyanandhan	Dravida Munnetra Kazhagam

== Election results ==
Vote share of winning candidates
2026	34.22%
2021	45.84%
2016	46.59%
2011	57.46%
2006	46.02%
2001	52.48%
1996	49.20%
1991	63.32%
1989	37.25%
1984	52.60%
1980	56.61%
1977	45.11%
1971	63.53%
1967	58.65%
1962	56.18%
1957	25.63%
1952	23.09%

=== 2026 ===
2026 Tamil Nadu Legislative Assembly election: Pollachi
Party	Candidate	Votes	%	±%
KMDK (DMK)	K. Nithyanandhan	62,013	34.22	▼10.64
AIADMK	Pollachi V. Jayaraman	57,386	31.67	▼14.17
TVK	G Ramanathan	53,819	29.70	New
NTK	N. Senthil Kumar	4,866	2.69	▼0.95
NOTA	NOTA	849	0.47	▼0.41
Margin of victory		4,627	2.55	▲1.57
Turnout		1,81,196	88.82	▲11.41
Registered electors		2,04,008		▼23,041
DMK gain from AIADMK		Swing	▼10.64	

=== 2021 ===
2021 Tamil Nadu Legislative Assembly election: Pollachi
Party	Candidate	Votes	%	±%
AIADMK	Pollachi V. Jayaraman	80,567	45.84%	−0.75
DMK	Dr. K. Varadharajan	78,842	44.86%	+6.2
MNM	V. T. Sathieshkumar	7,589	4.32%	New
NTK	N. Logeswari	6,402	3.64%	+2.83
NOTA	NOTA	1,546	0.88%	−0.46
AMMK	K. Sugumar	1,141	0.65%	New
Margin of victory		1,725	0.98%	−6.95%
Turnout		175,762	77.41%	−0.29%
Rejected ballots		50	0.03%	
Registered electors		227,049		
AIADMK hold		Swing	-0.75%	

=== 2016 ===
2016 Tamil Nadu Legislative Assembly election: Pollachi
Party	Candidate	Votes	%	±%
AIADMK	Pollachi V. Jayaraman	78,553	46.59%	−10.87
DMK	R. Tamilmani	65,185	38.66%	New
KMDK	K. Nithyanandhan	7,722	4.58%	New
BJP	R. Sivakumar	5,363	3.18%	+0.42
DMDK	S. Muthukumar	4,893	2.90%	New
NOTA	NOTA	2,254	1.34%	New
NTK	K. Umamaheswari	1,369	0.81%	New
Margin of victory		13,368	7.93%	−13.45%
Turnout		168,616	77.70%	−2.36%
Registered electors		217,007		
AIADMK hold		Swing	-10.87%	

=== 2011 ===
2011 Tamil Nadu Legislative Assembly election: Pollachi
Party	Candidate	Votes	%	±%
AIADMK	M. K. Muthukaruppannasamy	81,446	57.46%	+11.44
KNMK	K. Nithyanandhan	51,138	36.08%	New
BJP	V. K. Ragunathan	3,909	2.76%	+1.26
BSP	M. Kalimuthu	1,528	1.08%	New
Independent	N. Praveen Kumar	1,449	1.02%	New
Independent	P. K. Arumugam	1,221	0.86%	New
IJK	K. Manimaran	1,056	0.74%	New
Margin of victory		30,308	21.38%	19.21%
Turnout		141,747	80.06%	9.84%
Registered electors		177,052		
AIADMK hold		Swing	11.44%	

=== 2006 ===
2006 Tamil Nadu Legislative Assembly election: Pollachi
Party	Candidate	Votes	%	±%
AIADMK	Pollachi V. Jayaraman	62,455	46.02%	−6.47
DMK	D. Shanthi Devi	59,509	43.85%	+17.67
DMDK	S. Meenakshi Sundaram	7,543	5.56%	New
BJP	V. K. Ragunathan	2,039	1.50%	New
Independent	V. M. Jayaraman	1,291	0.95%	New
Independent	G. S. Gokulraj	1,003	0.74%	New
Independent	B. Manikandan	838	0.62%	New
Margin of victory		2,946	2.17%	−24.14%
Turnout		135,722	70.22%	9.59%
Registered electors		193,283		
AIADMK hold		Swing	-6.47%	

=== 2001 ===
2001 Tamil Nadu Legislative Assembly election: Pollachi
Party	Candidate	Votes	%	±%
AIADMK	Pollachi V. Jayaraman	64,648	52.48%	+21.56
DMK	R. Tamil Mani	32,244	26.18%	−23.02
MDMK	K. Varadharajan	22,014	17.87%	+1.68
Independent	M. Manikandan	1,338	1.09%	New
Independent	K. B. Asokan	1,193	0.97%	New
Independent	V. Subrahmaniem	919	0.75%	New
Margin of victory		32,404	26.31%	8.03%
Turnout		123,179	60.63%	−8.49%
Registered electors		203,219		
AIADMK gain from DMK		Swing	3.28%	

=== 1996 ===
1996 Tamil Nadu Legislative Assembly election: Pollachi
Party	Candidate	Votes	%	±%
DMK	S. Raju	58,709	49.20%	+14.21
AIADMK	Pollachi V. Jayaraman	36,895	30.92%	−32.4
MDMK	Andu @ Nachimuthu	19,318	16.19%	New
BJP	K. M. Ramalingam	1,094	0.92%	New
Independent	P. Dhandapani	621	0.52%	New
Margin of victory		21,814	18.28%	−10.05%
Turnout		119,324	69.13%	2.89%
Registered electors		183,063		
DMK gain from AIADMK		Swing	-14.12%	

=== 1991 ===
1991 Tamil Nadu Legislative Assembly election: Pollachi
Party	Candidate	Votes	%	±%
AIADMK	V. P. Chandrasekar	72,736	63.32%	+26.07
DMK	M. N. Andu Alias Nachimuth	40,195	34.99%	+1.11
Margin of victory		32,541	28.33%	24.96%
Turnout		114,867	66.24%	−7.06%
Registered electors		178,093		
AIADMK hold		Swing	26.07%	

=== 1989 ===
1989 Tamil Nadu Legislative Assembly election: Pollachi
Party	Candidate	Votes	%	±%
AIADMK	V. P. Chandrasekar	41,749	37.25%	−15.35
DMK	P. T. Balu	37,975	33.89%	−12.13
INC	N. Padmavathy	24,605	21.96%	New
Independent	S. T. Doriaswamy	3,133	2.80%	New
Independent	A. Venkatachalam	2,556	2.28%	New
Margin of victory		3,774	3.37%	−3.23%
Turnout		112,070	73.30%	−0.48%
Registered electors		156,063		
AIADMK hold		Swing	-15.35%	

=== 1984 ===
1984 Tamil Nadu Legislative Assembly election: Pollachi
Party	Candidate	Votes	%	±%
AIADMK	M. V. Rathinam	54,337	52.60%	−4
DMK	S. Raju	47,527	46.01%	+3.37
Independent	K. Chockalingam	872	0.84%	New
Margin of victory		6,810	6.59%	−7.37%
Turnout		103,293	73.78%	3.42%
Registered electors		145,707		
AIADMK hold		Swing	-4.00%	

=== 1980 ===
1980 Tamil Nadu Legislative Assembly election: Pollachi
Party	Candidate	Votes	%	±%
AIADMK	M. V. Rathinam	52,833	56.61%	+11.5
DMK	M. Kannappan	39,797	42.64%	+19.43
Independent	P. Kannaiyan	704	0.75%	New
Margin of victory		13,036	13.97%	−7.93%
Turnout		93,334	70.36%	8.57%
Registered electors		134,946		
AIADMK hold		Swing	11.50%	

=== 1977 ===
1977 Tamil Nadu Legislative Assembly election: Pollachi
Party	Candidate	Votes	%	±%
AIADMK	O. P. Somasundaram	34,896	45.11%	New
DMK	S. Raju	17,952	23.20%	−40.32
INC	M. K. Palanisamy	12,537	16.21%	New
JP	R. Natarajan	10,677	13.80%	New
Independent	C. Shanmukasundaram	474	0.61%	New
Independent	K. . Sethu	408	0.53%	New
Margin of victory		16,944	21.90%	−5.94%
Turnout		77,364	61.79%	−9.57%
Registered electors		127,400		
AIADMK gain from DMK		Swing	-18.42%	

=== 1971 ===
1971 Tamil Nadu Legislative Assembly election: Pollachi
Party	Candidate	Votes	%	±%
DMK	A. P. Shanmugasundara Goundar	41,654	63.53%	+4.88
Independent	A. Easwarasamy Gounder	23,396	35.68%	New
Independent	M. Rangasamy Naicker	517	0.79%	New
Margin of victory		18,258	27.85%	9.39%
Turnout		65,567	71.36%	−5.44%
Registered electors		96,560		
DMK hold		Swing	4.88%	

=== 1967 ===
1967 Madras Legislative Assembly election: Pollachi
Party	Candidate	Votes	%	±%
DMK	A. P. Shanmugasundara Goundar	37,480	58.65%	+17.12
INC	E. Gounder	25,688	40.20%	−15.98
Independent	Balu	740	1.16%	New
Margin of victory		11,792	18.45%	3.81%
Turnout		63,908	76.80%	−3.67%
Registered electors		85,643		
DMK gain from INC		Swing	2.47%	

=== 1962 ===
1962 Madras Legislative Assembly election: Pollachi
Party	Candidate	Votes	%	±%
INC	N. Mahalingam	38,929	56.18%	+30.55
DMK	Rangaswamy	28,780	41.53%	New
Independent	C. P. Kandasamy	1,589	2.29%	New
Margin of victory		10,149	14.65%	13.28%
Turnout		69,298	80.47%	−34.06%
Registered electors		89,033		
INC hold		Swing	30.55%	

=== 1957 ===
1957 Madras Legislative Assembly election: Pollachi
Party	Candidate	Votes	%	±%
INC	N. Mahalingam	52,076	25.63%	+2.53
INC	K. Ponniah (Sc)	49,309	24.26%	+1.17
PSP	P. Thangavel Gounder	33,534	16.50%	New
CPI	V. K. Rangaswamy (Sc)	31,648	15.57%	+2.46
Independent	A. S. Balasubramaniam	19,391	9.54%	New
Independent	E. Ramaswamy (Sc)	11,221	5.52%	New
Independent	M. Azhagamuthu (Sc)	4,030	1.98%	New
Independent	R. Varadappan (Sc)	2,009	0.99%	New
Margin of victory		2,767	1.36%	−3.89%
Turnout		203,218	114.53%	6.76%
Registered electors		177,434		
INC hold		Swing	2.53%	

=== 1952 ===
1952 Madras Legislative Assembly election: Pollachi
Party	Candidate	Votes	%	±%
INC	N. Mahalingam	35,148	23.09%	New
INC	P. K. Thirumurthy	27,151	17.84%	New
CPI	Marudhachalam	19,966	13.12%	New
CPI	Palanisami	17,491	11.49%	New
Socialist	Khazer Mahamad	12,660	8.32%	New
Independent	Jabakhanai	10,799	7.10%	New
Independent	Valangirippan	9,377	6.16%	New
Socialist	Shanmugasundaram	8,295	5.45%	New
Independent	Muppali Kudumban	4,421	2.90%	New
Independent	Joseph	2,996	1.97%	New
Independent	Sheikh Mastafi	1,981	1.30%	New
Margin of victory		7,997	5.25%	
Turnout		152,205	107.77%	
Registered electors		141,226		
INC win (new seat)				
