= G. M. Yahya =

Indian physician (born 1924)

- Born: 24 August 1924 (age 102); Chennai, Tamil Nadu, India
- Education: Madras Medical College, Chennai
- Occupation: Professor of Medicine

G. M. Yahya (born 24 August 1924) is an Indian physician. He is a former professor of Madras Medical College, Stanley Medical College and Kilpauk Medical College, Chennai, South India.

== Early life and education ==
Yahya was born in Chennai, Tamil Nadu on 24 August 1924. He is the maternal uncle of the Prince of Arcot, Nawab Mohammed Abdul Ali. Yahya had his school education from Madras Corporation School, Madrase-E-Azam and Mohammedan College. On completion of his school education, he joined Madras Medical College in the year 1944 to pursue undergraduate medical course, MBBS.

== Career ==
Yahya joined as demonstrator-tutor at Madras Medical College and later he became assistant professor. Before serving as dean of Thanjavu Medical College, Yahya worked as professor of medicine at Stanely Medical College and Head of the Integrated Medicine at Kilpauk Medical College in Chennai. He retired from his government service in the year 1982.

== Personal life ==
Yahya turned 100 on 24 August 2024.

== See also ==
- Madras Medical College
- Arcot Nawab
