= Ronald Carlton Vivian Piadade Noronha =

Indian civil service officer

R. Carlton Vivian Pidade Noronha
- Born: 14 May 1916; Hyderabad, Hyderabad State, India
- Died: 23 November 1982 (aged 66); Bhopal, Madhya Pradesh, India
- Other name: RP
- Occupations: Civil service officer, writer
- Known for: Administrative reforms
- Awards: 1975 Padma Bhushan

Ronald Carlton Vivian Pidade Noronha (1916–1982), known as Ron to his friends and Noronha to his colleagues, was an Indian Civil Service officer, writer and the longest serving Chief Secretary of Madhya Pradesh in independent India. He was the author of A Tale Told By An Idiot, an autobiography. The Government of India awarded him the Padma Bhushan, the third highest civilian award, in 1975.

== Biography ==
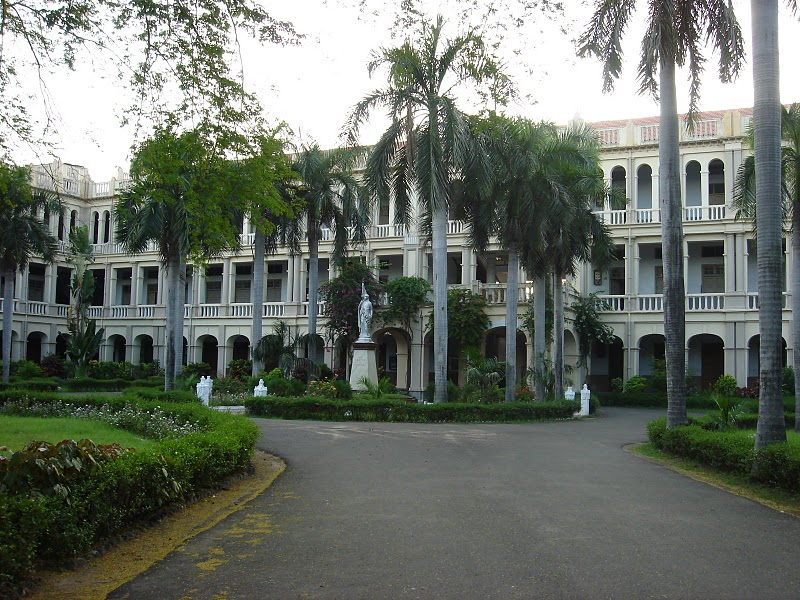
Loyola College, Madras

R. C. V. P. Noronha was born on 14 May 1916 at Hyderabad in the south Indian state of Telangana. The only son of an engineer-doctor couple, he did his pre-college at Inter College, Vishakhapatnam and secured a graduate degree with honours from Loyola College, Madras and moved to the London School of Economics which earned a BSc (honours) from the University of London. Subsequently, he joined Indian Civil Service, topping the qualifying examination.

He was the second longest serving chief secretary of Madhya Pradesh, having served as the chief secretary for two terms, November 1963 to August 1968 and September 1972 to May 1974 when he retired from service at the age of 58.

After retirement, Ron Noronha lived as a farmer in a one room house in a village called Sankal, 20 kilometers from Bhopal. He was affectionately known as Baba by the children and adults of the village alike. He would also provide first aid for common ailments like diarrhea and fever and even ferried emergency patients to Bhopal sometimes. After his death, the village was named after him as Noronha Sankal.

He published his autobiography in 1976 under the title, A Tale Told By An Idiot. He was married to Amy Alvares and the couple had two sons, Ashok and Terence, and two daughters, Gabrielle and Anjali. He died on 23 November 1982, at the age of 66, at Bhopal in Madhya Pradesh.

== Awards and honors ==
The Government of India awarded him the Padma Bhushan, the third highest civilian award, in 1975. RCVP Noronha Academy of Administration, the principal civil service training institute of the Government of Madhya Pradesh, is named after him.

== See also ==
- Anthony de Sa (politician)

Preceded by H. S. Kamath	Chief Secretary Government of Madhya Pradesh; 1963–1968	Succeeded by M. P. Shrivastava

Preceded by R. P. Naik	Chief Secretary Government of Madhya Pradesh; 1972–1974	Succeeded by M. S. Chaudhary
