= Madanur Ahmed Ali =

Indian surgical gastroenterologist

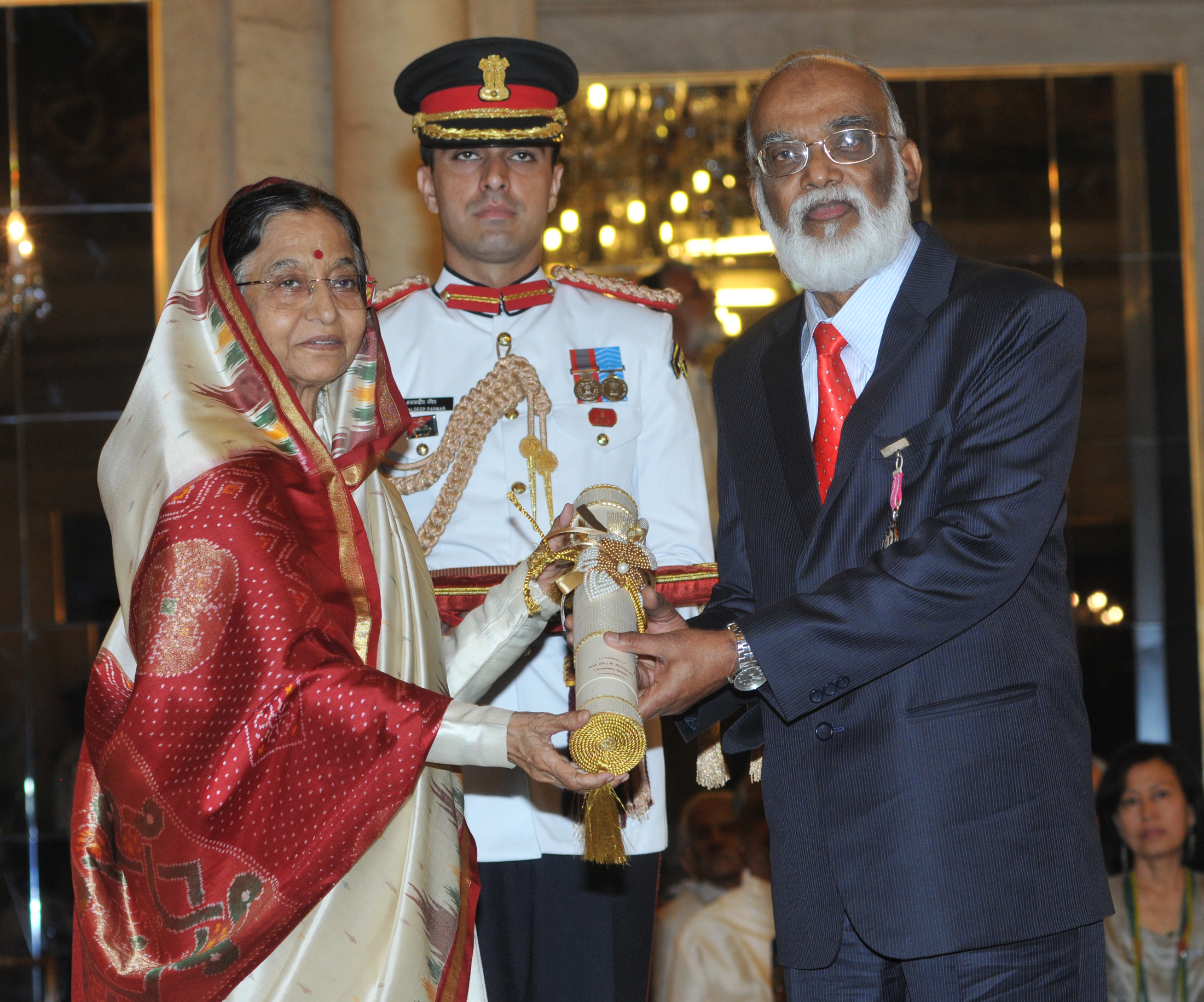
- President Pratibha Devisingh Patil presenting the Padma Shri Award to Ali in 2011
- Born: Chennai, India
- Occupation: Gastroenterologist
- Awards: Padma Shri

Madanur Ahmed Ali, is an Indian surgical gastroenterologist from Chennai. An alumnus of Madras Medical College, he is credited with several publications in peer reviewed journals. The Government of India honored Ali in 2011, with the fourth highest civilian award of Padma Shri.
