= V. P. Chandrasekar =

Indian politician

V. P. Chandrasekar is an Indian politician and former Member of the Legislative Assembly of Tamil Nadu. He was elected to the Tamil Nadu legislative assembly as an Anna Dravida Munnetra Kazhagam (Jayalalitha) candidate from Pollachi constituency in 1989 election, and as an Anna Dravida Munnetra Kazhagam candidate in 1991 elections.
