= Indian Rheumatology Association =

Indian Rheumatology Association (IRA)
- Type: Professional Medical Organization
- Purpose: Rheumatology
- Location: India
- Key people: President: Aman Sharma; President-Elect: Vinod Ravindran; Immediate Past President: S Chandrashekara; Vice President: Sapan Pandya; Secretary: Raj Kiran Dudam; Secretary-Elect: Able Lawrence; Treasurer: Durga Prasanna Misra
- Website: www.indianrheumatology.org

The Indian Rheumatology Association (IRA) is a professional organization of rheumatologists and related professionals in India. Its annual meetings called IRACON and are held in November or early December. Besides the national conference, IRA organises regional CMEs and zonal conferences for promoting Rheumatology education and awareness among medical professionals. As of December 2025, the President of Indian Rheumatology Association is Dr Aman Sharma.

== Journal ==
The association publishes the quarterly peer-reviewed medical journal, the Indian Journal of Rheumatology. It has been published quarterly since 2006 and was formerly published as the Journal of Indian Rheumatism Association from 1993 until 2005. The Journal was started by A.N.Chandrasekaran its first editor, who also started the first dedicated department of rheumatology in India in 1979. The editor-in-chief of the renamed journal in 2006 was Ashok Kumar (AIIMS).
