= Kasibhatta Brahmaiah Sastry =

- Born: 2 February 1863; Palivela village, East Godavari district, Andhra Pradesh, India
- Died: 29 October 1940 (aged 77)
- Writing career
- Notable work: Upanyasa Payonidhi (1911)

Kasibhatta Brahmaiah Sastry (2 February 1863 – 29 October 1940) was a noted Sanskrit and Telugu scholar and who coined the term "Navala" in Telugu literature. He is an orthodox Brahmin scholar from Andhra pradesh. He was a great pandit well versed in Sanskrit and Telugu and an adept in writing critical literary essays in Telugu. He collected various religious Essays and Writings and published in 1911 by the title of "Upanyasapayonidhi". He had already learned the English language by that lime, and embarked upon a serious study of Hinduism and Sastras. He started a journal "Rajayogi" in kakinada. He was editing a monthly journal by the title of Aryamatha Bodhini.

== Early life and education ==
He was born on 2 February 1853 at Palivela village of East Godavari district. His parents are Subbamma and Brahmavadhani. In 1883, he started "Aryamathabodhini" at Kakinada. He started a library named "Vivekananda pustaka bhandagaram" affiliation to his sabha "Artyamathabodhini".

He was opposed to Viresa lingam Pantulu in all respects—in religious thought, social reform and literature. He was always on the alert to expose the loopholes in Viresalingam's writings and social reform activities.
