= Vincent D'Souza =

Vincent D'Souza is a journalist and media entrepreneur based in Chennai. He is the editor and publisher of two community newspapers, The Mylapore Times and The Arcot Road Times in the city. He is also the executive editor of the largest neighbourhood newspaper in Chennai, The Adyar Times. The three newspapers have a combined circulation of over 85,000 copies a week.

== Career as journalist ==
D'Souza began his career as a journalist in 1980 after completing his BS in physics from Chennai's Loyola College. He has reported for The Week magazine of the Malayala Manorama group, and was a stringer for BBC Radio. He covered the 1998 Coimbatore serial bomb blasts, and its aftermath for the Beeb. For a brief while D'Souza was also the editor of Indian Express (Madras) Friday supplement on cinema, art and entertainment.

He also teaches Reporting at Bharthya Vidya Bhavan in Mylapore, Chennai.

== Neighbourhood papers ==
He currently edits three freely distributed English community newspapers in Chennai: Adyar Times, Mylapore Times and Arcot Road Times. In 1999 he started the internet website KutcheriBuzz.com, focused on south Indian classical music and dance. Along with the website, he also brings out a monthly 8-12 page Kutcheribuzz newsletter. During the fortnight-long December Music Season in Chennai, Kutcheribuzz morphs into a single-sheet eveninger, distributed for free outside concert halls. Over the last couple of years, Kutcheribuzz.com has added audio and video news reports of popular classical music and dance events such as the Tiruvaiyaru Tyagaraja Aradhana, and the Chidambaram dance festival that takes place at the Nataraja Temple during Shivaratri.

D'Souza's experiment with a free community newspaper in the former French enclave of Puducherry was a short-lived one. He pulled the shutter on the paper, the Pondicherry Times, in 2001.

He also promotes two other major events in Chennai - the Mylapore Festival, held in Mylapore on Pongal eve, and the Madras Day celebrations held to celebrate the city.

Besides fulfilling the unique communication needs of specific neighbourhoods, D'Souza's publications have been a training ground for aspiring journalists. Unlike several community papers, Mylapore Times, Arcot Road Times and Adyar Times are professionally run papers with reasonably good production standards. Despite being small publications, D'Souza's papers have steadfastly tried to keep the wall between news and advertising intact.
