= Damal Kandalai Srinivasan =

Indian social worker

- Born: 7 October 1933 (age 92); Kanchipuram, Tamil Nadu, India
- Occupations: Social worker Business person
- Years active: Since 1952
- Known for: Hindu Mission Hospital, Chennai; Valluvar Gurukulam Higher Secondary School
- Spouse: (Late)Hema Srinivasan
- Children: Two sons D.K. Hari and Dr D.K. Sriram
- Awards: Padma Shri; Navjeevan Puraskar Award; Samskara Ratna; Dr. K. V. Sarath Babu Memorial Wisdom International Award; Dr. K. V. Thiruvengadam Health Care Award

Damal Kandalai Srinivasan (born 1933) is an Indian social worker, business person, philanthropist and the co-founder of Hindu Mission Hospital, Chennai. He is also the secretary of Valluvar Gurukulam, an educational institution founded in 1940 for the children of the refugees from Burma, which has since grown to the present-day Valluvar Gurukulam Higher Secondary School. The Government of India awarded him the fourth highest civilian honour of the Padma Shri, in 2016, for his contributions to society.

== Biography ==
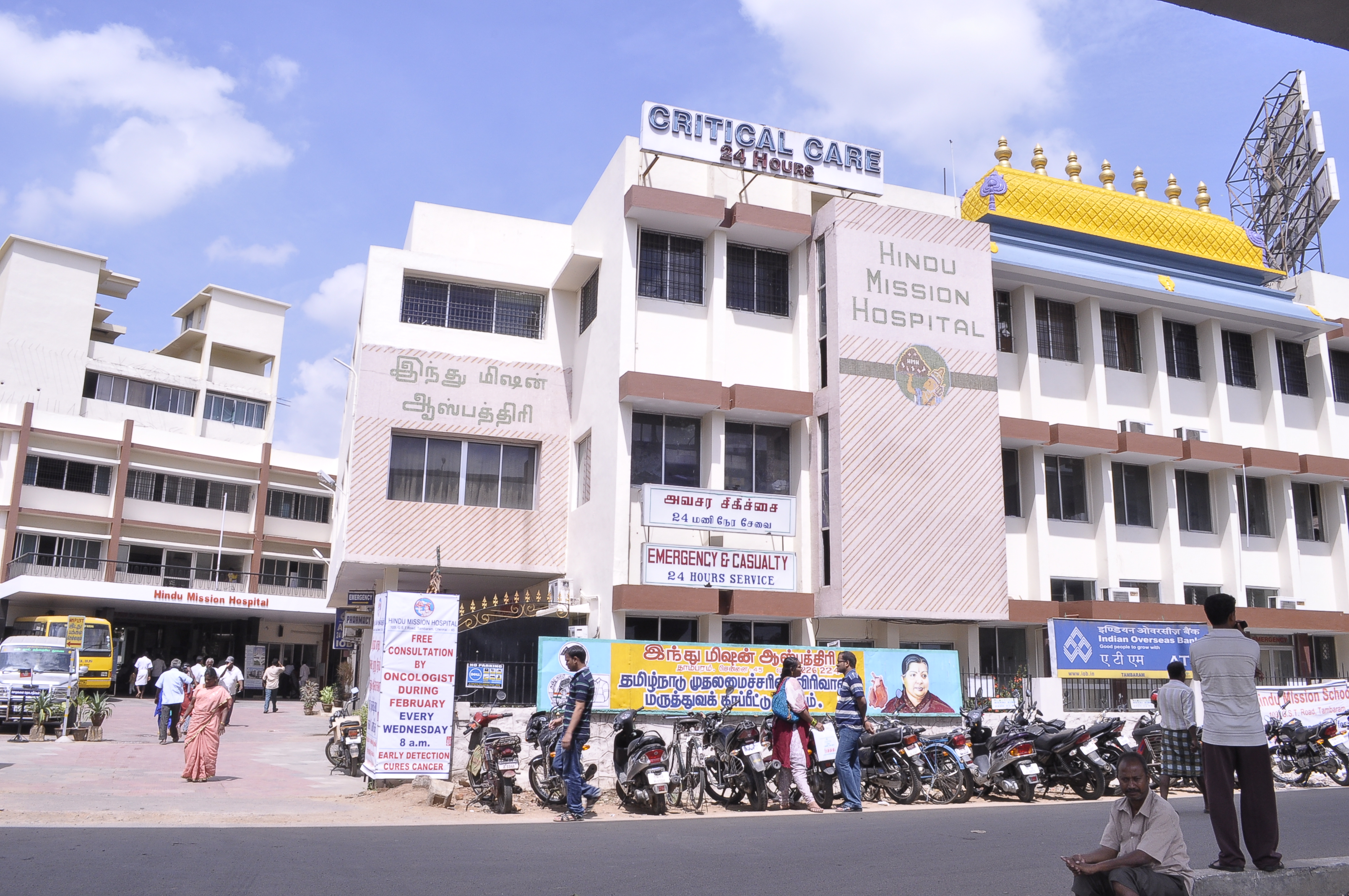
Hindu Mission Hospital

D. K. Srinivasan, born on 7 October 1933 in Kanchipuram, in the Indian state of Tamil Nadu to D. K. Varadachari, a locally known lawyer, graduated in economics from Loyola College, Chennai after which he secured his master's degree in business management (MBA) from the University of Madras. Subsequently, instead of opting for a job, he founded his own business in petroleum and FMCG sectors. Later, he is known to have abandoned his business for social service and, in December 1982, started a philanthropic venture in a shed in Tambaram, for providing medical assistance to people with limited financial means. The venture, over the years, has grown to become the present-day Hindu Mission Hospital, a 220-bedded healthcare facility, where he continues to serve as the honorary secretary. Medical facilities such as dialysis are available at the hospital for poor patients at a reported cost of US$4 and the hospital is also known to provide free cataract surgeries, prosthetics and hearing aids.

Valluvar Gurukulam Higher Secondary School, founded in 1940 for providing educational facilities for the refugee children from Burma, is another organization Srinivasan is involved with and he serves as the honorary secretary of the institution. He is also involved with the activities of a number of social, healthcare and religious organizations; Asthiga Samajam, Thirunarpani Trust, Thirumalai Mission Hospital, Ranipet, Devaraja Swami Temple, Kanchipuram, Shree Gayathri Trust and Sri Krishna Trust - School For Dyslexia are some of them. In the aftermath of the 2004 Indian Ocean earthquake and tsunami, he worked for the rehabilitation of the affected people of Tamil Nadu by constructing shelter homes and by providing furniture and laboratory equipment for damaged schools. He is a recipient of several honors such as Navjeevan Puraskar Award (1999), Samskara Ratna of Bharath Vikas Parishad (2004), Dr. K. V. Sarath Babu Memorial Wisdom International Award (2004) and Dr.K. V. Thiruvengadam Healthcare Award of Rotary Club of Madras East and Chettinad Hospital and Research Institute (2006). The Government of India awarded him the civilian honor of the Padma Shri in 2016.

Srinivasan is married to Hema and the couple has two sons. The family lives in Chennai.

== See also ==
- Hindu Mission Hospital, Chennai
