= Sakthi Group =

Indian industrial conglomerate

- Industry: Conglomerate
- Headquarters: Coimbatore, Tamil Nadu, India
- Area served: Worldwide
- Products: Automobiles; Sugar; Industrial Alcohol; Auto Components; Logistics; Textiles; Transport; Energy; Healthcare; Finance; Coffee; Publications; Education; Hospitality Industry; IT Services; FMCG & Soya Products; Dairy Products; Retailing
- Revenue: ▲US$2 billion (2020)
- Total assets: ▲US$1.2 billion (2020)
- Number of employees: 7000 (2020)
- Website: sakthigroup.com

The Sakthi Group is an Indian multinational conglomerate with operational areas in India, China, Europe, Middle East and United States. The group has operations in Sugar, Dairy, Industrial Alcohol, Automobile distribution and components, Transportation, Energy, Textiles, IT, Education and Healthcare. N. Mahalingam is the Founder. The group has automotive dealerships for leading brands of Maruti Suzuki and Tata vehicles in various places in South India. The group is also involved in Petrol Pump Operations, Indane LPG Distribution and the sale of consumer products and electronics. It also has a footprint in the textiles industries with Sri Sakthi Textiles Ltd.

== Industries ==
=== Sugars ===
In 1961, Sakthi Sugars Limited was established and commenced its commercial production in 1964. It has sugar plants at Sakthi Nagar, Sivaganga, Modakurichi and Dhenkanal. With the aggregate capacity of 19,500 tonnes of cane Crush Per Day it is one of the largest producers of sugar in India. It diversified into the manufacturing of industrial alcohol in 1972. In 1970, Chamundeswari Sugars Limited was incorporated and commercially produced in 1974 with 1250 TCD at K. M. Doddi, Maddur Taluk, Mandya District. As a byproduct of sugar cane, bagasse is used to generate electricity and the excess power generated is exported to the power grid.

=== Logistics/transport ===
The Anamallais Bus Transport Limited, a passenger transport company was founded on 28 August 1931 in Tamil Nadu by P Nachimuthu Gounder. ABT Parcel Service was established in October 1964. After the nationalization of buses in 1972, ABT started to focus on Logistics. It has a fleet size of 600 trucks which carry more than 2.5 lakh tonnes worth Rs.4000 crores every year. Later, in 2006 Nov it reentered into passenger transport business by ABT X Travels and now it has fleet size of 50 buses operating in 108 sectors.

=== Automobiles ===
It has various automobiles dealership with Maruti Suzuki, Tata Motors, Force Motors, Mahindra and BSA Electric Scooters. ABT Maruti is one of the oldest Maruti dealer networks in India, has been operating since 1984. Anamalais Engineering (P) Ltd. and Anamalias Retreading Company are engaged in automobiles construction sector.

=== Finance ===
Sakthi Finance Ltd. is one of the non–banking finance company engaged in Commercial Vehicle financing with over 43 branches in Tamil Nadu, Kerala, Karnataka & Andhra Pradesh. Sakthifinance Financial Services Limited (SFFSL), part of the Sakthi group is engaged in locker and deposit activities with over 25 Branches in Tamilnadu with Excellent customer service.

=== IT services ===
- ABTInfo.Net (Data Center and Cloud Services)
- ABT Info Systems

=== Auto components ===
Sakthi Automotive Group division was started by Dr. Manickam Mahalingam in 1983 after he returned from his master's degree from United States of America. Sakthi Automotive Component was first Indian Company in India to manufacture and supply brakes components to Indian car manufacturer in 1985.

Sakthi Automotive Group established its operation in United States of America and China in 2010 and within few years Sakthi has manufacturing facilities in India, China, Europe and North America.

- Sakthi Auto Component Limited (SACL)
- Sakthi Portugal
- Sakthi Auto Ancillary Private Limited
- Sakthi Bethel Automotive China

=== Food ===
- ABT Industries Limited - Dairy Division
- Sakthi Sugars Limited – Soya Division
- Sakthi Coffee Estates Private Limited

=== Publications ===
- Rukmani Offset Press
- Kisan World
- Om Sakthi Publications

=== Education ===
Sakthi is well known for the educational institutions mostly in Coimbatore and Pollachi. The institutions are Kumaraguru College of Technology in Coimbatore and Dr. Mahalingam College of Engineering and Technology, NGM College Pollachi, and Nachimuthu Polytechnic College in Pollachi.
