= Natesan Rangabashyam =

Indian gastroenterologist (1936–2013)

- Born: 5 November 1933; Chennai, Tamil Nadu, India
- Died: 14 July 2013 (aged 76); Chennai, Tamil Nadu, India
- Occupations: Gastroenterologist; Medical academic
- Known for: Surgical gastroenterology Proctology
- Children: 2
- Awards: Padma Bhushan; B. C. Roy Award; Royal Society of Medicine Wall of Honour; GoT Living Legend Award

Natesan Rangabashyam (1936–2013), popularly known by his initials NR, was an Indian surgical gastroenterologist and medical academic, known for his pioneering efforts in the fields of surgical gastroenterology and proctology in India. He was known to have established the department of Surgical Gastroenterology at Madras Medical College and introduced the first MCh course in Surgical Gastroenterology in India. A former honorary surgeon to the President of India, he received B. C. Roy Award, the highest Indian award in the medical category, twice. The Government of India awarded him the third highest civilian honour of the Padma Bhushan, in 2002, for his contributions to medical science.

== Biography ==
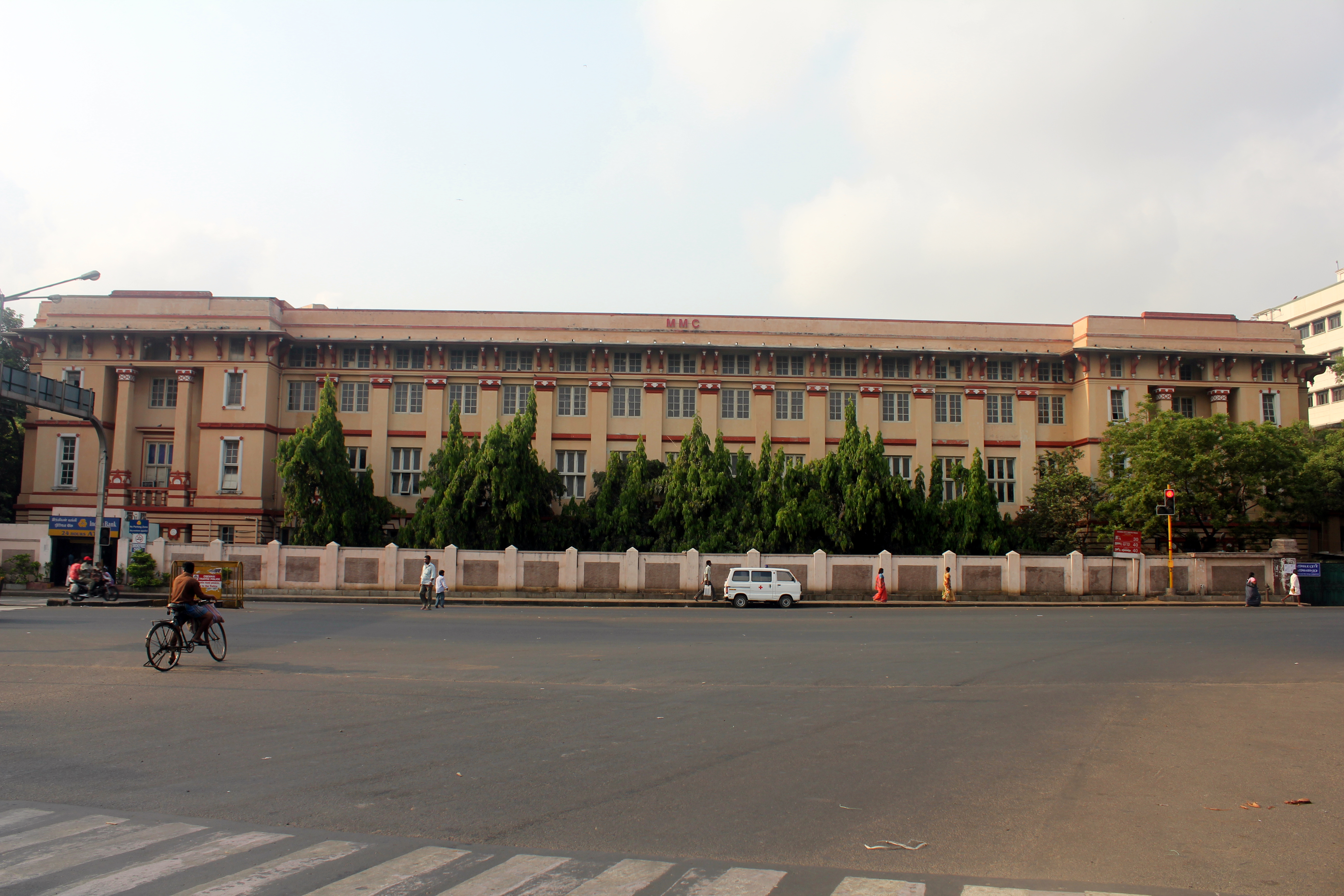
Madras Medical College.

Rangabashyam was born on 5 November 1936 in Chennai, in the south Indian state of Tamil Nadu to Natesan-Vittobai couple. After graduating in science from Loyola College, Chennai, he continued his studies in medicine at Madras Medical College from where he obtained the degree of MBBS in 1957. Later, he joined the Royal College of Surgeons of England but subsequently moved to the Royal College of Surgeons of Edinburgh where he completed the primary surgeon's course. This was followed by a short stint at the Royal Alexandra Hospital, Rhyl as a medical officer where he trained under Ivor Lewis and Owen Daniels, known surgical gastroenterologists. After securing his FRCS from the Royal College of Surgeons of Edinburgh, he worked for brief periods at Western General Hospital, Royal Alexandra Hospital and St Mark's Hospital.

On his return to India, he joined Thanjavur Medical College as an honorary surgeon in the temple town of Thanjavur in 1964 where he established the department of general surgery and a clinic dedicated for gastrointestinal diseases. He introduced Vagotomy and was known to have performed his first Hepatectomy there. He stayed in Thanjavur for 5 years and moved to Chennai in 1969 to join Stanley Medical College as a consultant surgeon and served the institution for 6 years till he moved to Madras Medical College in 1975 as the honorary professor of surgery and the head of the newly formed department of surgical gastroenterology. It was here, he helped start the first MCh course in gastroenterology in India as well as the first nursing diploma course in enterostomal therapy.

Rangabashyam served as an examiner at several medical universities in India and abroad, including the Royal College of Surgeons of Edinburgh and was credited with efforts in introducing the FRCS examination of the Edinburgh Royal College in India. He served as the honorary surgeon to R. Venkataraman, the eighth President of India, and as a consultant surgeon at the Armed Forces Medical College, Pune. He delivered keynote addresses in many international medical conferences and contributed chapters to two medical texts, Oxford Textbook of Surgery and Recent Advances in Surgery. He was involved with the activities of the Association of Surgeons of India as its secretary and, later, as president and also headed the Indian Society of Gastroenterology as its president in 1983. He was instrumental in establishing the headquarters of ASI in Chennai which was a commendable feat by itself and the ASI continues to be active in spite of the internet era.

Rangabashyam died in his sleep on 13 July 2013, at the age of 79, survived by his wife, Chitralekha, son Om Prakash and daughter, Mahalakshmi.

== Awards and honors ==
Rangabashyam, a member of the Academy of Medicine, Singapore, was an elected fellow of the International College of Surgeons, the International Academy of Proctology and the American College of Surgeons. He was a recipient of B. C. Roy Award, the highest Indian award in the medical category, which he received twice. The Government of India awarded him the civilian honor of the Padma Bhushan in 2002 and the Royal Society of Medicine included his name on the Wall of Honor at Panel no 5. On 11 February 2010, Vittobai, Rangabhashyam's mother, was felicitated at a program, Salute to Mothers, in Chennai. The same year, he received the Living Legend Award from the Government of Tamil Nadu.

== See also ==
- Proctology
