= M. K. Muthukaruppannasamy =

Indian politician

M. K. Muthukaruppannasamy is an Indian politician and was a member of the Tamil Nadu Legislative Assembly from the Pollachi constituency from 2011 to 2016. He represented the All India Anna Dravida Munnetra Kazhagam party.
