= S. Raju =

Indian politician

S. Raju is an Indian politician and former Member of the Legislative Assembly of Tamil Nadu. He was elected to the Tamil Nadu Legislative Assembly as a Dravida Munnetra Kazhagam candidate from Pollachi constituency in the 1996 election.
