= S. S. Badrinath =

Indian ophthalmologist (1940–2023)

- Born: Sengamedu Srinivasa Badrinath; 24 February 1940; Triplicane, Madras, Madras Presidency, British India
- Died: 21 November 2023 (aged 83); Chennai, Tamil Nadu, India
- Education: Madras Medical College
- Spouse: Vasanthi Badrinath
- Scientific career
- Fields: Ophthalmology, vitreo-retinal surgery

Sengamedu Srinivasa Badrinath (24 February 1940 – 21 November 2023) was an Indian ophthalmologist who was the founder and chairman emeritus of Sankara Nethralaya, one of India's largest charitable eye hospitals. He was an elected fellow of the National Academy of Medical Sciences. Badrinath received the Padma Bhushan, the third-highest civilian award in India, in 1996. He was also a recipient of several other honours, including the Padma Shri and the Dr. B. C. Roy Award.

== Early life ==
Sengamedu Srinivasa Badrinath was born in Triplicane, a historic / old neighbourhood of Chennai, India. His father, S. V. Srinivasa Rao, an engineer, was employed in the Madras Government Service. His mother, Lakshmi Devi, was the daughter of an advocate from Nerur, Tamil Nadu. Both of his parents died while he was still in his teens, and he completed his medical studies with the insurance money obtained following the death of his father. Beginning his education late at age 7 due to a childhood illness, Badrinath studied at PS High School, Mylapore, and Sri Ramakrishna Mission High School, Chennai. He completed his collegiate studies at Loyola College between 1955 and 1957.

== Medical career ==
Badrinath graduated from the Madras Medical College, Chennai, in 1963. He did his internship and a year of internal medicine residency at the Glasslands Hospital, New York. Following his studies of Basic Sciences in Ophthalmology at the New York University Medical School, he did his residency in Ophthalmology at the Brooklyn Eye and Ear Infirmary, New York, and a fellowship with Charles Schepens at the Retina Service of the Massachusetts Eye and Ear Infirmary, Boston, Massachusetts. He became a fellow of the Royal College of Surgeons of Canada in 1969 and diplomate of the American Board of Ophthalmology in 1970. He returned to India in 1970, and for a period of six years worked at the Voluntary Health Services in Chennai as a consultant. He set up a private practice in ophthalmology and vitreoretinal surgery at the H.M. Hospital (1970 to 1972) and Vijaya Hospital, Chennai (1973 to 1978). He had over 60 peer reviewed publications.

== Sankara Nethralaya ==
In 1978, Badrinath, along with a group of philanthropists, founded the Medical & Vision Research Foundations in Madras in 1978. Sankara Nethralaya, a charitable not-for-profit eye hospital is a unit of the Medical Research Foundation.

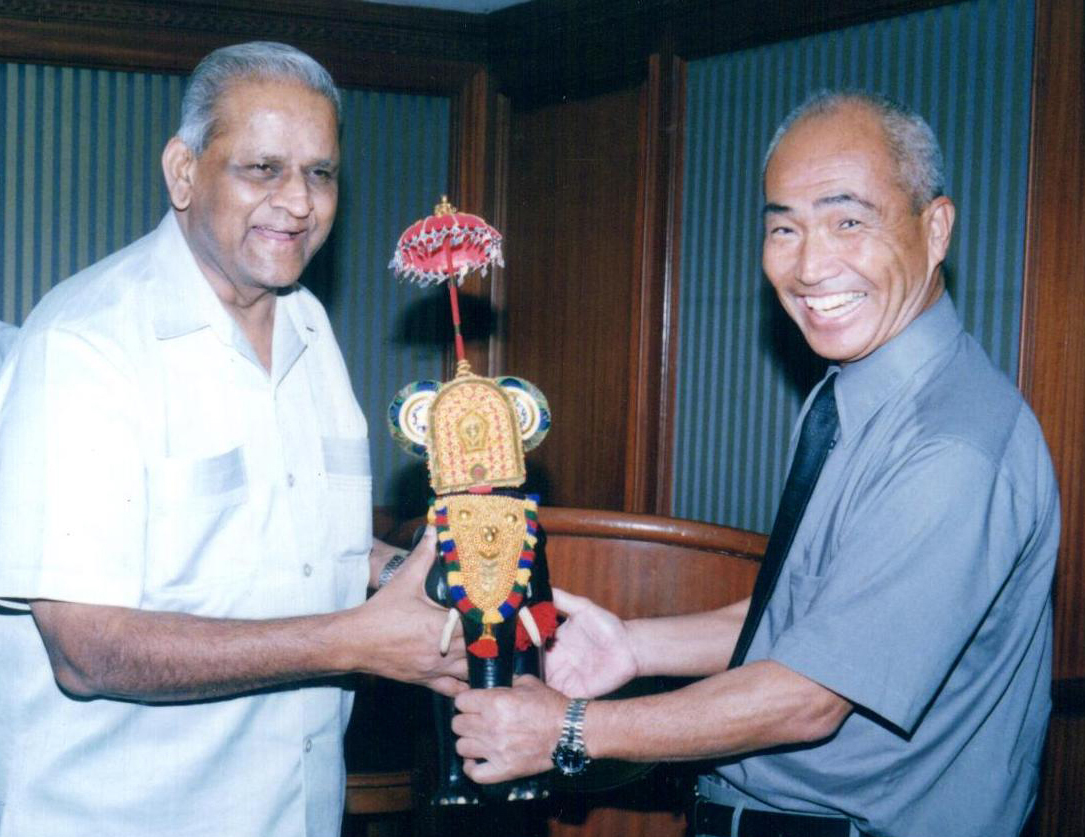
Dr. Badrinath with Prof. Mori, after MoU Signing with NCRM in Chennai, February, 2004.

On average, 1200 patients are seen, and 100 surgeries are performed every day. From its inception in 1978, Sankara Nethralaya has offered fellowship programmes in Vitreo-Retinal Surgery, Cornea, Oculoplasty, Glaucoma, Uvea, and General Ophthalmology to holders of postgraduate degrees and diplomas in Ophthalmology. Among their involvement in cutting edge research, corneal limbal stem cell regeneration jointly with NCRM was awarded a patent in 2010, based on a MoU signed in February 2004. The institute also offers training programmes for graduates in Ophthalmology.

== Personal life and death ==
Badrinath married Vasanthi Badrinath in 1967, whom he met in Brooklyn, New York. Vasanthi was a pediatrician and hematologist. The couple later settled in Chennai. They have two sons, Ananth Badrinath and Seshu Badrinath.

S. S. Badrinath died on 21 November 2023, at the age of 83.

Vasanthi died in August 2021.

== Awards and honours ==
- 1996: Padma Bhushan
- 1983: Padma Shri
- 1991: Dr. B. C. Roy National Award
- 1992: Paul Harris Fellow Award
- 2009: V. Krishnamurthy Award for Excellence
- 2009: The Madras City Ophthalmological Association Lifetime Achievement Award
- 2014: Lifetime Achievement Award, Vitreo Retinal Society, India
