= Arungundram =

Village in Tamil Nadu, India

- Village
- Location in Tamil Nadu, India Arungundram (India)
- Coordinates: 12°54′00″N 79°19′00″E
- Country: India
- State: Tamil Nadu
- Elevation: 163 m (535 ft)

Languages
  - Official: Tamil
- Time zone: UTC+5:30 (IST)

Arungundram (also spelled Arunkundrum) is a village in Tamil Nadu between Arcot and Kannamangalam. The village is surrounded by hillocks and paddy fields, and is about 8 km from Arcot in Vellore district. As of the year 2011, the village had a total population of 1,056.
