= Kadiyala Ramachandra =

Indian medical doctor and poet

- Born: 6 November 1919; Tamil Nadu, India
- Died: February 2007 (aged 87)
- Occupation: Physician
- Awards: Padma Shri; Johnstone Gold Medal; T. M. Nair Gold Medal; The Raja of Panagal Prize; Dr. Rangachari Prize

Kadiyala Ramachandra (1919-2007) was an Indian medical doctor, poet, a former superintendent of the Government General Hospital, Chennai and a former head of the department of medicine at Madras Medical College. His efforts were reported behind the establishment of the Department of Oncology & Cancer Chemotherapy and the Rheumatic Care Unit at the General Hospital. He was a recipient of the fourth highest Indian civilian award of Padma Shri in 1974.

== Biography ==
Ramachandra was born on 6 November 1919 in the Indian state of Tamil Nadu and did his early studies at Doveton Corrie Boys School and Loyola College, Chennai before graduating in medicine from the Madras Medical College in 1949. He worked as the superintendent of the Government General Hospital in Chennai and during his tenure there, the hospital started two new departments, the Department of Oncology & Cancer Chemotherapy and the Rheumatic Care Unit. He also worked as a professor and the head of the department of medicine at his alma mater, Madras Medical College, served as a member of the senate and the syndicate of the University of Madras and headed the committee of post graduate examinations. After superannuation, the university appointed him as its Professor Emeritus.

Ramachandra published 52 scientific papers and delivered several lectures of which Curzon Endowment Lectures (1968) and Dr. K. Kudumbiah's Endowment lecture (1971) were notable. His research on the use of Indian herbs in the treatment of Bronchial Asthma were reported in the Indian news and he delivered a talk series on health issues which was broadcast by the All India Radio. He was known to have written a treatise on the History of Medicine which was published by the University of Madras. His literary publication, Poems of Introspection is an anthology of 53 poems which was released in 2003.

Ramachandra was a recipient of Johnstone Gold Medal, T. M. Nair Gold Medal, The Raja of Panagal Prize and the Dr Rangachari Prize in Medicine. The Government of India awarded him the civilian honour of Padma Shri in 1974. He died in February 2007, at the age of 87.
