= RCVP Noronha Academy of Administration =

Training institute in Bhopal, India

Coordinates: 23°12′24″N 77°25′37″E

RCPV Noronha Academy of Administration and Management
- आर.सी.वी.पी. नरोन्हा प्रशासन एवं प्रबंधकीय अकादमी
- Official Emblem of Academy
- Former name: लालबहादुर शास्त्री लोक प्रशासन संस्थान
- Motto: योगः कर्मसु कौशलम्
- Motto in English: (Excellence in Action)
- Type: Civil Services Training Institute
- Established: 1966
- Founder: Ronald Carlton Vivian Piadade Noronha
- Parent institution: Madhya Pradesh General Administrative Department [MPGAD]
- Affiliations: Government of Madhya Pradesh
- Dean: श्री सचिन सिन्हा
- Director: श्री मुजीबुर्रहमान खान
- Academic staff: डॉ. अनुपमा रावत
- Administrative staff: श्रीमती नेहा भारतीय
- Location: Bhopal, Madhya Pradesh, 462016, India
- Campus: 43; Urban
- Language: English Hindi
- Website: https://www.academy.mp.gov.in/#

RCVP Noronha Academy of Administration

RCPV Noronha Academy of Administration and Management (where RCVP stands for Ronald Carlton Vivian Piadad) is the apex and nodal training institute of Madhya Pradesh, India. It organises training programmes for the senior officers of the government of Madhya Pradesh, government of India and Public Sector Undertakings. It has been effectively playing an advisory role for the Madhya Pradesh government in Human Resource Development. It is also a coordinating institution for the various training institutions of the state.

== History ==
Established in 1966 as Lal Bahadur Shastri Institute of Public Administration, the Academy of Administration and Management trains the officers of the State Government, Government of India and Public Sector Undertakings. Ronald Carlton Vivian Piadade Noronha, ICS, was a distinguished civil servant who served as Chief Secretary of the state for almost 10 years (1963–1968, 1972–1974). This Institution has been honoured with the National Award of Excellence by Govt. of India, in the field of 'Trainers Training'. Again in 1999 it has been honoured as the best Institution in formulating Total Quality Management action plan. The Academy has been certified by ISO 9001:2000 from SGS (UK)in 2003. Distinguished civil servants of Chief Secretary rank are posted as Directors General of the Academy.

== Vision ==
To provide leadership for quality improvement in public service in the state of Madhya Pradesh.

== Objectives ==
RCVP Noronha Academy of Administration assists and advises the government of Madhya Pradesh in evolving training policies for its departments. It also provides guidance to other training activities so as to develop a federated system of training programmes for direct recruits of the higher services of the state.

== Location ==
RCVP Noronha Academy of Administration is situated in the southeastern part of the Bhopal on the banks of Shahpura Lake in a 43-acre (170,000 m^{2}) campus. It is surrounded by natural beauty, which provides a pleasant environment.

== Directors General ==
| S.No. | Director General | From | Up to |
|---|---|---|---|
| 1. | Dr. Ishwardas | 19.08.1987 | 31.01.1991 |
| 2. | Mr S.N. Rao | 25.03.1991 | 09.10.1991 |
| 3. | Mr Vinay Mullik | 10.10.1991 | 31.10.1992 |
| 4. | Mr V.G.Nigam | 31.10.1992 | 31.10.1993 |
| 5. | Mr S.C. Behar | 20.03.1994 | 30.11.1995 |
| 6. | Mr K.K. Sethi | 16.03.1996 | 31.10.1996 |
| 7. | Mrs Mrinalini Garde | 01.11.1996 | 31.03.1997 |
| 8. | Mr S.C. Behar | 01.04.1997 | 31.01.1999 |
| 9. | Mr P.K. Mehrotra | 29.04.1999 | 31.07.2001 |
| 10. | Mr H.G. Oberoi | 01.08.2001 | 28.02.2002 |
| 11. | Mrs Kiran Vijay Singh | 01.03.2002 | 31.05.2004 |
| 12. | Mr Arun Kumar Gupta | 01.06.2004 | 31.08.2004 |
| 13. | Dr J.L. Bose | 01.10.2004 | 31.01.2005 |
| 14. | Mr S.K. Chaturvedi | 14.02.2005 | 04.08.2005 |
| 15. | Mrs Mala Shrivastava | 05.08.2005 | 07.08.2007 |
| 16. | Ms. Kanchan Jain | 01.07.2015 | 31.08.2018 |
| 17. | Mr. A.P. Shrivastava | | |
