= Anthony de Sa (civil servant) =

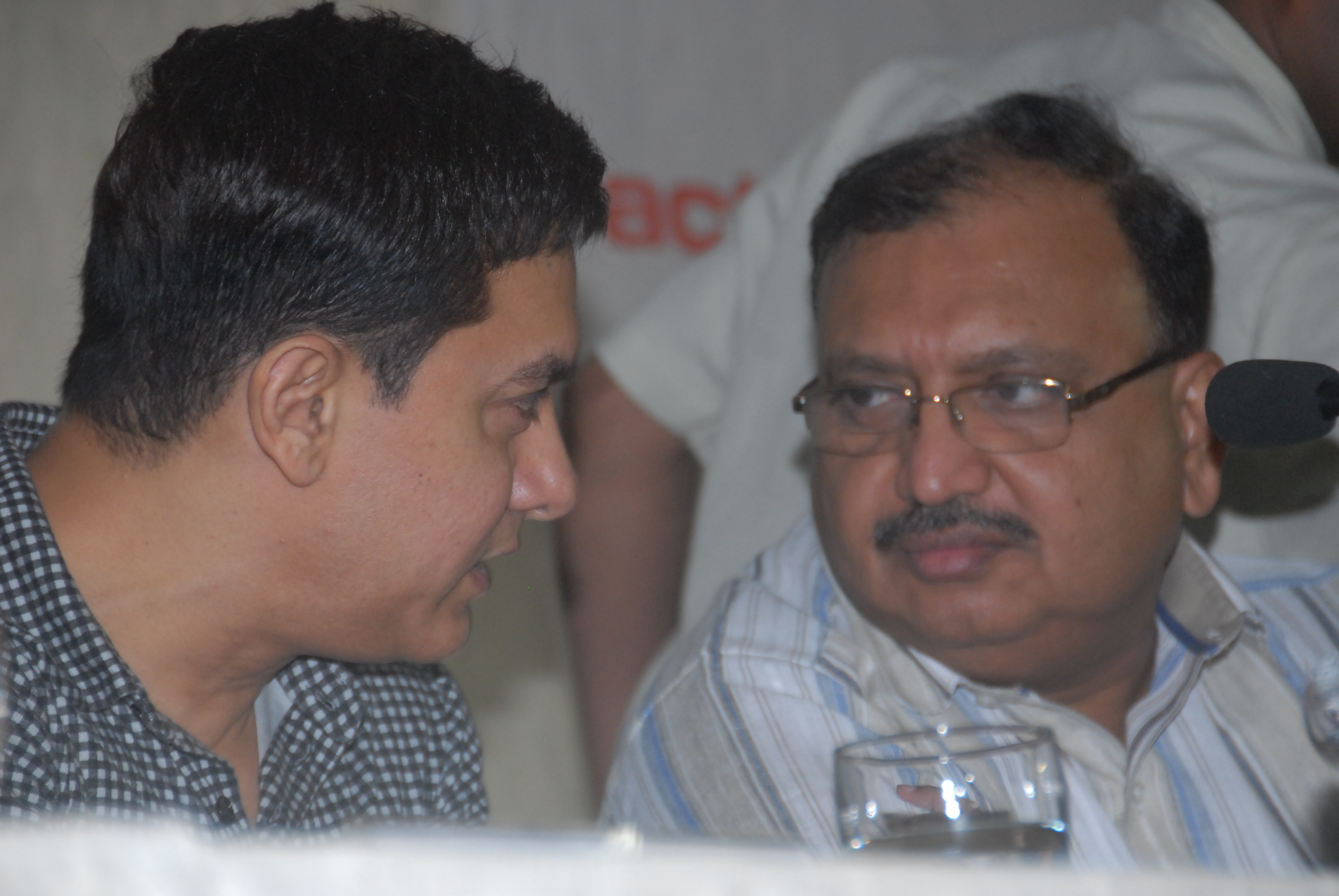
- Anthony de Sa with Aamir Khan

29th Chief Secretary of Madhya Pradesh
- In office 17 February 2016 – 1 November 2017
- Preceded by: R Parasuram
- Succeeded by: Basant Pratap Singh

Personal details
- Born: 9 October 1956 (age 69) Bhusaval, Maharashtra
- Spouse: Malusha de Sa
- Education: University of Mumbai; St. Xavier's College, Mumbai
- Occupation: Civil Servant

Anthony (Tino) de Sa is a retired Indian Administrative Services (IAS) officer, and writer-poet, currently based in his hometown of Goa. He has been appointed as Liquidator of the Mapusa Urban Cooperative Bank (MUCB).

Post retirement, he was the 1st Chairman of the Real Estate Regulatory Authority (RERA) of Madhya Pradesh. He has been Chief Secretary of the State of Madhya Pradesh from 2013 up to his retirement from the IAS in 2017.

He belongs to the 1980 Batch of the IAS He schooled at St. Aloysius School, Bhusaval. He is a Gold Medallist (M.A.) from the University of Mumbai, and was the recipient of the Rotary Award for the Best Student of the College in 1976. He also took a master's degree from Harvard University, where he was awarded the Littauer Fellowship for "academic excellence, leadership skills and service to the community".

Among his several postings, he has served as District Collector of Chhindwara District, Administrator of the Jabalpur Municipal Corporation, and Housing Commissioner of Madhya Pradesh.

In the Central Government, he has served as Director in the Ministry of Environment and Forests (India), Controller of the Bhabha Atomic Research Centre (BARC) in Mumbai, and Joint Secretary in the Ministry of Commerce and Industry (India), where he dealt with Foreign Trade Policy and India's negotiations in the WTO.

He has also served in the United Nations for five years, as Director of the UNIDO Centre for South-South Industrial Co-operation.

Several of his articles have been published in the Time of India. Some of his poems have been anthologised by the Poetry Society of India and Poetree.

He is married to Malusha de Sa.
