= A. P. Shanmugasundara Goundar =

Indian politician

A. P. Shanmugasundara Goundar is an Indian politician and former Member of the Legislative Assembly of Tamil Nadu. He was elected to the Tamil Nadu legislative assembly as a Dravida Munnetra Kazhagam candidate from Pollachi constituency in 1967, and 1971 elections A.P.Shanmugasundaram is a former Member of Legislative Assembly from Pollachi Constituency.. He graduated with B.Sc (Chemistry ) from Loyola College, Chennai.
