= Parvataneni Brahmayya =

Indian chartered accountant

Parvataneni Brahmayya or P Brahmayya (October 2, 1908 – 1980) was a chartered accountant, former ICAI president and founded Brahmayya & Co., a firm of Chartered accountants in 1932.

== Education and professional career ==
An alumnus of the Madras Loyola College and trained in the Institute of Chartered Accountants in England and Wales, he was President (1962-63) and a part of the Central Council, the highest decision making body of the Institute of Chartered Accountants of India for about 15 yrs; was a trustee of Unit Trust of India; a board member of the State Bank of India apart from being on several government advisory committees. According to the Managing Director of The Hindu, N. Murali, Brahmayya's generosity, especially towards young chartered accountants was legendary.

A hall in the Institute of Chartered Accountants of India building at Chennai and Hyderabad was named after him. He was a man of varied interests and a lover of both books and sports.
