= Sankara Nethralaya =

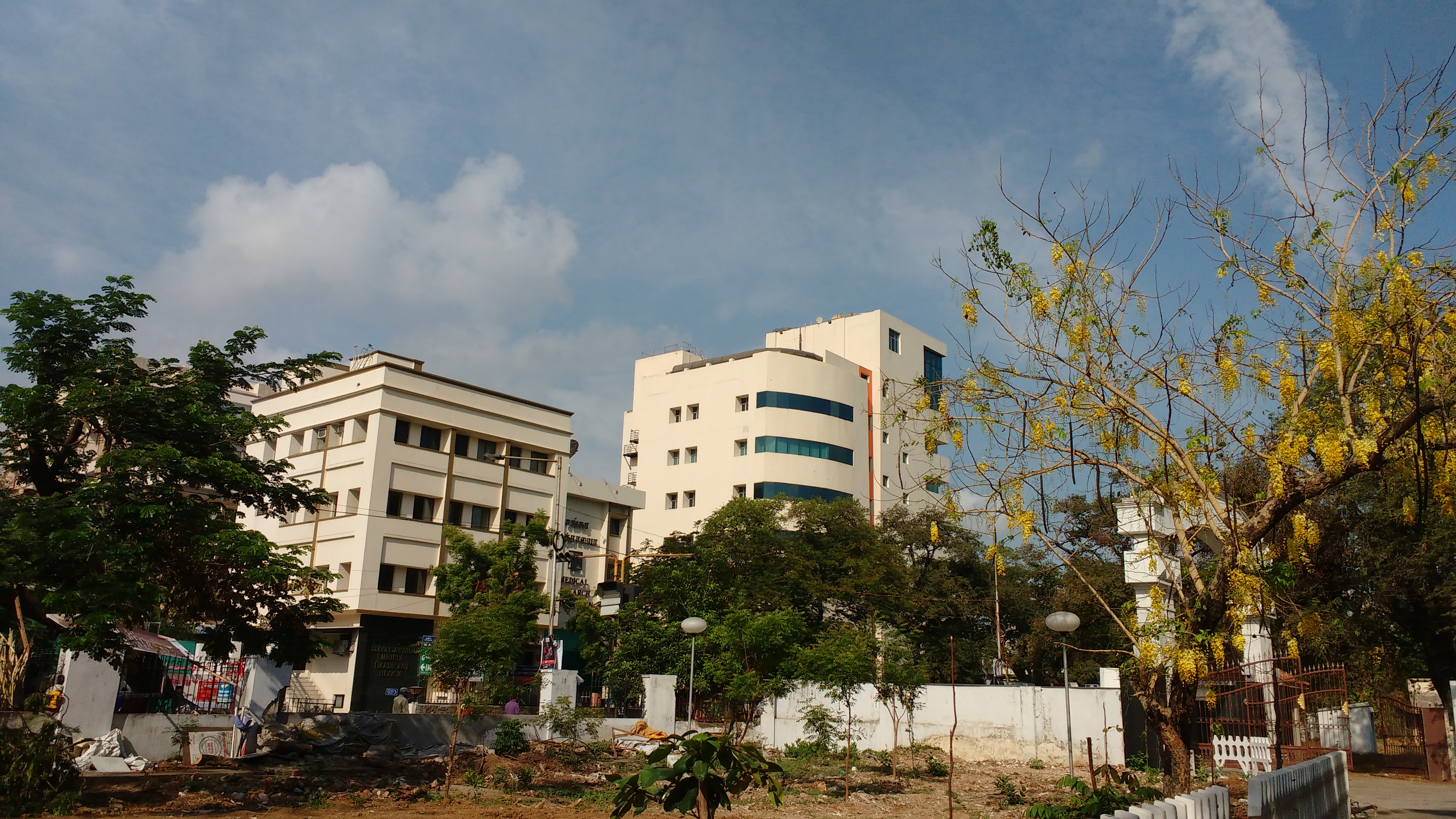
- Sankara Nethralaya in Chennai

Geography
- Location: Chennai; Kolkata

Organisation
- Type: Medical Research Foundation; Eye Specialist
- Network: Chennai, Tamil Nadu; Kolkata, West Bengal

Services
- Beds: 1000

History
- Founded: 1978

Links
- Website: www.sankaranethralaya.org

Sankara Nethralaya is a non-profit missionary institution for ophthalmic care headquartered in Chennai, India.

Sankara Nethralaya was rated among the top four ophthalmic institutions worldwide in 2020 by Newsweek. Nani A. Palkivala, former Indian ambassador to United States, described Sankara Nethralaya as the "Best managed charitable organization in India."

== History ==
In 1976 when addressing a group of doctors, Sri Jayendra Saraswathi, the Sankaracharya of the Kanchi Kamakoti Peetam spoke of the need to create a hospital. Under the leadership of Sengamedu Srinivasa Badrinath, a group of philanthropists founded a charitable not-for-profit eye hospital. On Vinayaka Chaturthi, 6 September 1978, the hospital came into existence. It was named Sankara Nethralaya, or "The Temple of the Eye".

== Expansion ==
Sankara Nethralaya has been branching out very fast recently. Apart from the five centres in Chennai and in Kolkata and Rameswaram, the hospital is now present in Bengaluru, Tirupati, Andhra Pradesh, Jharkhand as TTD Sri Srinivasa Sankara Nethralaya and mobile eye surgical unit.

The Medical Research Foundation focuses on providing "world-class eye care, community services, research and education -- broadly recognized as the four pillars of the Foundation." In January 2020, it was reported that the hospital collection crossed Rs. 200 crores (Rs 2000 million) for the first time, according to its annual report. In 2018–19, the number of free surgeries in the FY 2018-19 was 22,810—some 36% of total surgeries. It has Mobile Eye Surgery Units in three Indian states—Tamil Nadu, Andhra Pradesh and Jharkhand, which have conducted some 4520 totally free cataract surgeries in different villages across the three states.

=== Branches ===
- Sankara Nethralaya Main Campus
- C. U. Shah Sankara Nethralaya
- JKCN
- Navasuja Sankara Nethralaya
- Sankara Nethralaya Super Speciality Clinic (SNSSC)
- Aditya Birla Sankara Nethralaya, Mukundapur, Kolkata
- kamalnayan Bajaj Sankara Nethralaya, New Town, Kolkata
- Mobile Eye Surgical Unit, Tatanagar, Jharkhand
- Sankara Nethralaya Optometry Clinic, Olympia Tech Park, Chennai
- Sankara Nethralaya, Rameshwaram
- Sri Srinivasa Sankara Nethralaya, Tirupati

== Community ophthalmology ==
The Jaslok Community Ophthalmic Centre at Sankara Nethralaya offers free services to economically weaker sections.

== International patients ==
Apart from receiving patients from all over the country, Sankara Nethralaya renders service to international patients including the US, UK and Bangladesh. Bangladesh was reported as having topped the number of foreign patients at the Chennai branch of Sankara Nethralaya.

Yearly, some 56,000 Bangladeshi patients arrived in Chennai for eye care at Sankara Nethralaya, accounting for some 60% of all patients in the hospital. The tertiary ophthalmic hospital, provides treatment to patients particularly from South Asia—Sri Lanka, Bangladesh, Afghanistan; Africa—Kenya, Nigeria, South Africa, among other countries; and the Middle East including UAE and Oman.

== Academia ==
From its inception in 1978, the C U Shah Ophthalmic Postgraduate Training Center has been offering fellowship programmes in Vitreo-Retinal Surgery and General Ophthalmology to holders of postgraduate degree and a diploma in Ophthalmology.

The Elite School of Optometry (ESO) is the first college of optometry in India offering a four-year professional degree: B.Optometry. It is run by Sankara Nethralaya in collaboration with SASTRA University, Tanjore from the academic year 2017–18. Previously, it functioned in collaboration with Birla Institute of Technology and Science (BITS), Pilani. In August 2025, at its three-day International Vision Science and Optometry Conference, ESO launched a dedicated Sports Optometry Research Lab.

The Sankara Nethralaya Academy serves as a platform for creating, processing and disseminating knowledge related to eye care, ophthalmic research and hospital administration. The institution offers wide-ranging programmes including allied health sciences like Optometry (M.Optom, Fellowships and Certificate courses), Ophthalmic Dispensing (B.Sc.), Medical Laboratory Technology (B.Sc. & M.Sc.), Hospital & Healthcare Management (BBA & MBA), Hospital Administration (MHA), etc...

The Vision Research Foundation (VRF) has, over the last two decades, been doing premier work in the areas of ocular infections, cataract, tumours, angiogenesis and genetic basis of eye diseases and pathobiology of other ophthalmic disorders. Scientists working with VRF have developed basic techniques in applied medical biotechnology essential to understand disease processes involved in ophthalmology particularly related to etiopathogenesis and identification of infectious, genetic and malignant disorders. VRF has applied for four patents in Diagnostic Microbiology. One of the patents awarded was on corneal limbal stem cell in vitro expansion for treating ocular surface disorders jointly with Nichi-In Centre for Regenerative Medicine (NCRM). The research was started based on a MoU with NCRM exchanged in February 2004 by Dr. H.N. Madhavan, in the presence of the Japanese consul general in Chennai, Mr. Ryuzo Kikuchi.

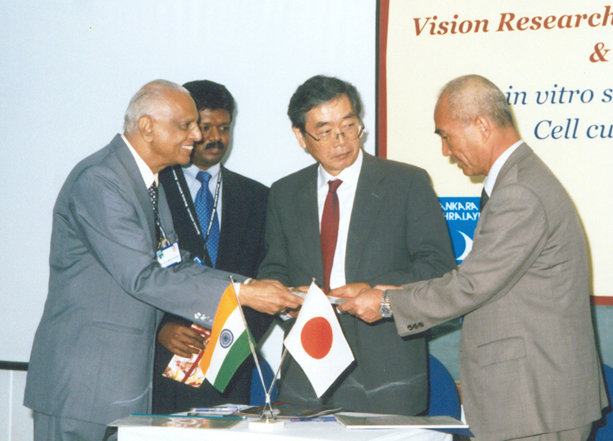
Dr.H.N. Madhavan exchanging a MoU with NCRM in the presence of Consul General of Japan Mr. Ryuzo Kikuchi, February 2004 in Chennai, India.

== Teleophthalmology ==
A unique teleophthalmology project was started in villages in a 100 km radius of Chennai with a mobile bus offering primary eye care. It was inaugurated by the former president of India, A. P. J. Abdul Kalam, in 2003. The key to the project was a mobile bus, designed by a team from Sankara Nethralaya with assistance from the Indian Space Research Organisation.

== Sankara Nethralaya Women's Auxiliary (SWAN) ==
Registered as a public charitable trust in 1984, SWAN volunteers have served Sankara Nethralaya. All medical and post operative needs of poor patients, including food and spectacles, are taken care of by SWAN volunteers. This apart, SWAN volunteers assists patients in the hospital, help the Medical Records Department, Library, Patient service dept, organise conferences, events, maintain the STD booths, utility and coffee shop at the hospital premises.

== Awards and recognitions ==
- Sankara Nethralaya has won the Corporate Citizen Award in Economic Times Awards for Corporate Excellence 2007.
- Sankara Nethralaya was adjudged "Best Eye Hospital in India" by a survey conducted by Outlook magazine (July 2002).
- The Week (April 2005) and more recently by a survey conducted by The Week (April 2007)...
- Sankara Nethralaya received an award from NASSCOM for the Best IT Adoption in the Healthcare Sector. The function took place at Mumbai on 26 November 2008.

== See also ==
- Healthcare in Chennai
