= Hinduism in Lithuania =

Lithuanian Hindus

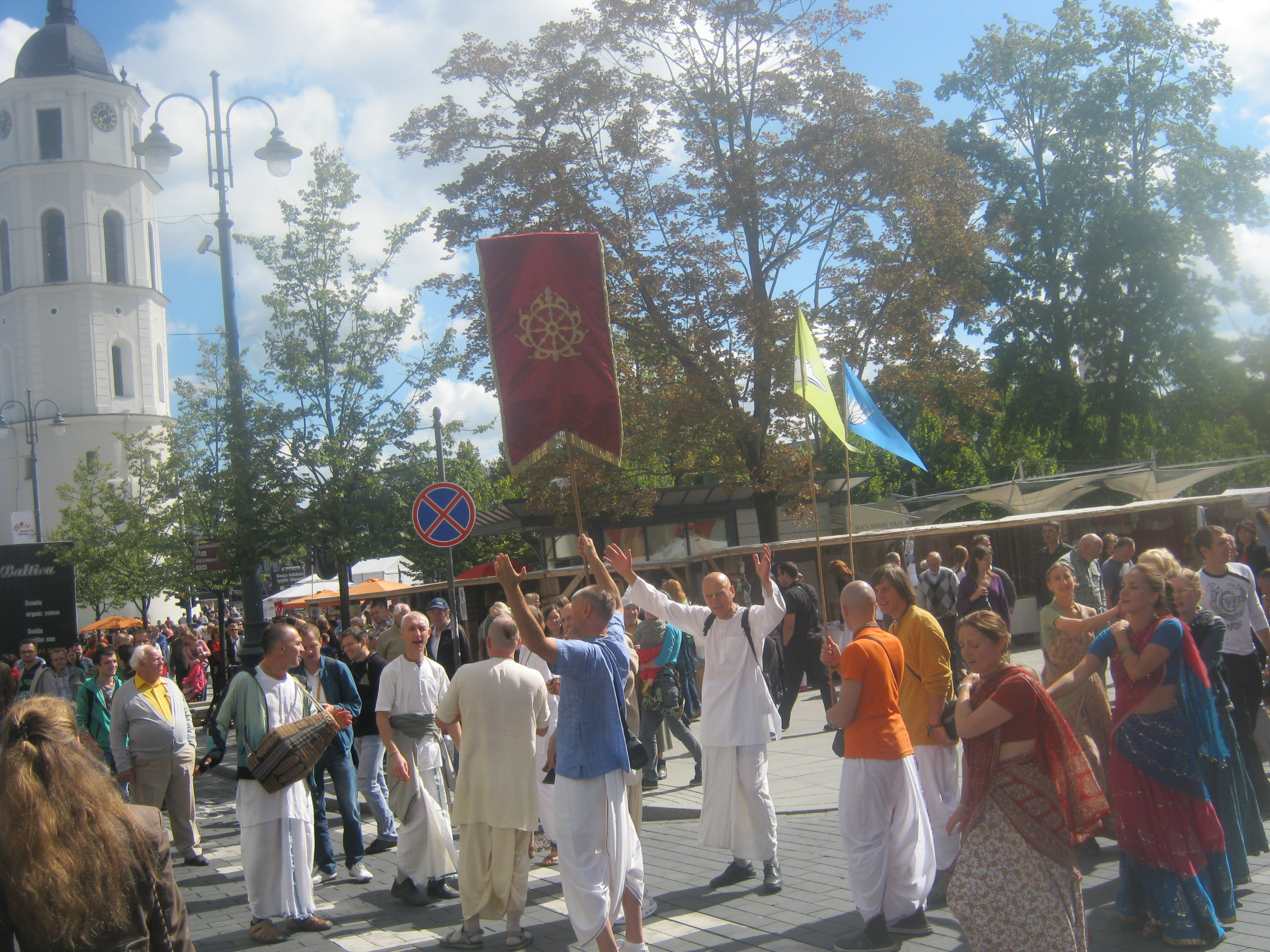
- ISKCON Devotees in Lithuania

Total population
- ~300

Religions
- Hinduism; Majority: Vaishnavism

Languages
- Sanskrit, Lithuanian

Hinduism in Lithuania is a minority religion and a modern development in the country's religious landscape. In recent decades, some practices related to Hinduism, such as yoga and meditation, have spread in Lithuania both through secular yoga and through Indian spiritual movements. Under the 1995 Law on Religious Communities and Associations, Hinduism is categorised as a non-traditional religion. Scholarly interest in Hinduism increased in the late 19th and early 20th centuries through Indology and Sanskrit studies. Beginning in 1979, ISKCON followers initially met in underground groups to avoid KGB persecution before ISKCON was legally recognised in 1989. In the 2021 census, Lithuania had 248 ISKCON members though other denominations were not enumerated. Other groups in the country include the Art of Living Foundation, the Sathya Sai Baba movement, and the Brahma Kumaris. Scholars have also noted parallels between Romuva, a polytheistic religion derived from the traditional mythology of the Lithuanians, and Hinduism.

== Demographics ==
According to the 2001 census, 265 people identified themselves as followers of ISKCON, 107 were followers of Sathya Sai Baba, and 12 followed Osho Rajneesh. In a 2011 census, ISKCON followers grew to 344, Sathya Sai Baba followers dropped to 49. In the 2021 census, only ISKCON followers were counted which decreased to 248. The population of other Hindu denominations are not clear as they are clubbed under "Other" category in the census.

According to sociological studies, contemporary Hindu group members are mostly urban-dwelling, university-educated, female, and typically aged 35 to 50.

Under the 1995 Law on Religious Communities and Associations, nine religious communities (predominantly Roman Catholic Church affiliated) are recognised as "traditional," whereas Hinduism is classified as "non-traditional." Followers of Hinduism in Lithuania are often viewed as "strangers among us" or stigmatized, whereas non-religious, spiritual self-development groups, like the Art of Living, are more tolerated.

== History ==
=== Early academic studies ===
Knowledge about India reached Lithuania in the 16th century through Lithuanian Christian missionaries who served in South Asia and collected Eastern art. Formal study of Middle Eastern and Asian languages began in the 18th century at Vilnius University.

In the late 19th and early 20th centuries, Lithuanian intellectuals, such as Maironis, Vincas Krėvė-Mickevičius, Balys Sruoga, Stasys Salkauski, and Vydūnas, developed an interest in Indian literature and philosophy. Vydūnas joined the Theosophical Society, practiced Ayurveda, created a philosophical system blending Vedanta with Neoplatonism and Christianity, and published the first Lithuanian translation of the Bhagavad Gita. Krėvė-Mickevičius completed doctoral research on Indo-European origins, taught at the University of Baku, and served as Dean of Humanities at Vytautas Magnus University. He also incorporated Indian motifs into his literary works.

During the interwar independence period (1918-1940), Antanas Poska and Mata Salcius studied Sanskrit and Indian culture in South Asia. Poska pursued anthropological studies in Mumbai. Between 1933 and 1939, Eastern art history was taught at Vytautus Magnus University. Other scholars published studies on Indology and Asian civilization.

=== Soviet period ===
Under the Soviet regime, public religious practice was suppressed per Marxist-Leninist atheism, and interest in Eastern spirituality developed underground. In 1967, the Society of the Friends of India (Indijos biciuliu draugija) was formed in Vilnius, allowing students and scholars to explore Indian religion, Sanskrit, and ancient Baltic spiritual heritage.

Following World War II, Lithuanian Indologists trained at academic institutions in Moscow, Leningrad, and Ulan-Ude. In Vilnius, the Lithuanian Society for Oriental Studies was established in 1979, and centres for Oriental and Asian studies were later founded at Vilnius University, Vytautus Magnus University, and Klaipeda University. In the 1970s, Ricardas Mironas introduced Sanskrit into the curriculum at Vilnius University and published translations of 13 verses of the Rig Veda into Lithuanian.

ISKCON, or the Hare Krishna movement, reached Lithuania in 1979 through preachers and Russian devotees. Early Lithuanian devotees, led by students, established informal underground prayer groups in 1980. The KGB viewed ISKCON as a reactionary and ideologically dangerous movement. Adherents faced surveillance, interrogations, expulsions from university, unemployment, and forced enlistment into the Soviet Army. Some adherents were involuntarily committed to psychiatric hospitals where they received psychotropic drug treatments against their will. Despite this, devotees produced over 100,000 copies of the Bhagavad Gita As It Is. In 1987, devotees held their first street chanting procession and obtained official legal registration in 1989.

== Organisations ==
Yoga has gained a presence in Lithuania, both as a secular practice and through Indian spiritual movements with roots in Hinduism.

=== International Society for Krishna Consciousness ===
Since independence, ISKCON temples exist in converted apartment buildings in Vilnius and Kaunas. As of 2020, the temples host weekly Sunday worship services, public lectures, vegetarian meals, and housed monastic communities. ISKCON also oversees Food for Life, a charity providing free vegetarian meals to individuals in need.

=== Art of Living Foundation ===
The Art of Living Foundation was established in Lithuania in 1993 and officially registered as a public foundation in 2000. It was founded by Indian spiritual teacher Sri Sri Ravi Shankar, and its activities in Lithuania have been studied as part of the development of neo-Hindu religious movements in the country. The organisation's courses in Lithuania have incorporated asanas (yoga postures), pranayama (breathing practices) and meditation, alongside the Sudarshan Kriya breathing technique developed by Shankar. By 2009, over 10,000 Lithuanians had completed the foundation's introductory courses. Shankar visited Lithuania in 2000, 2004, and 2009 and met political figures.

=== Other organisations ===
Other groups active in Lithuania include the Sathya Sai Baba group, Brahma Kumaris, Sahaja Yoga, Transcendental Meditation, followers of Sri Chinmoy, and the Osho meditation centre Ojas.

== Romuva and Hinduism ==
Romuva is a polytheistic religion derived from traditional Lithuanian mythology, that reconstructs the religious rituals of the Lithuanians prior to the state's Christianisation in 1387, though its practitioners continue Baltic polytheism traditions. While Romuva is considered a non-traditional sect of modern Christianity, it maintains strong philosophical and ritual links with Hinduism. The sacred texts of Lithuanian dainos are comparable to the early Hindu text of the Rig Veda, though this similarity is not found in later texts.

Jonas Trinkūnas, a leading founder and priest of modern-day Romuva, performed marriages similar to Hindu Vedic weddings. Mantras and chants were recited, and the couple took vows after circling the fire. Trinkūnas further claimed that Rajputs were the ancestors of a Romuva tribe that once ruled Lithuania for many years and some of their ancient practices are practiced in modern era.

Similarly, Ašvieniai are divine twins in the Lithuanian mythology, counterparts of Vedic Ashvins. The Ašvieniai are represented as pulling a carriage of Saulė (the Sun) through the sky. Ašvieniai, depicted as žirgeliai or little horses, are common motifs on Lithuanian rooftops.

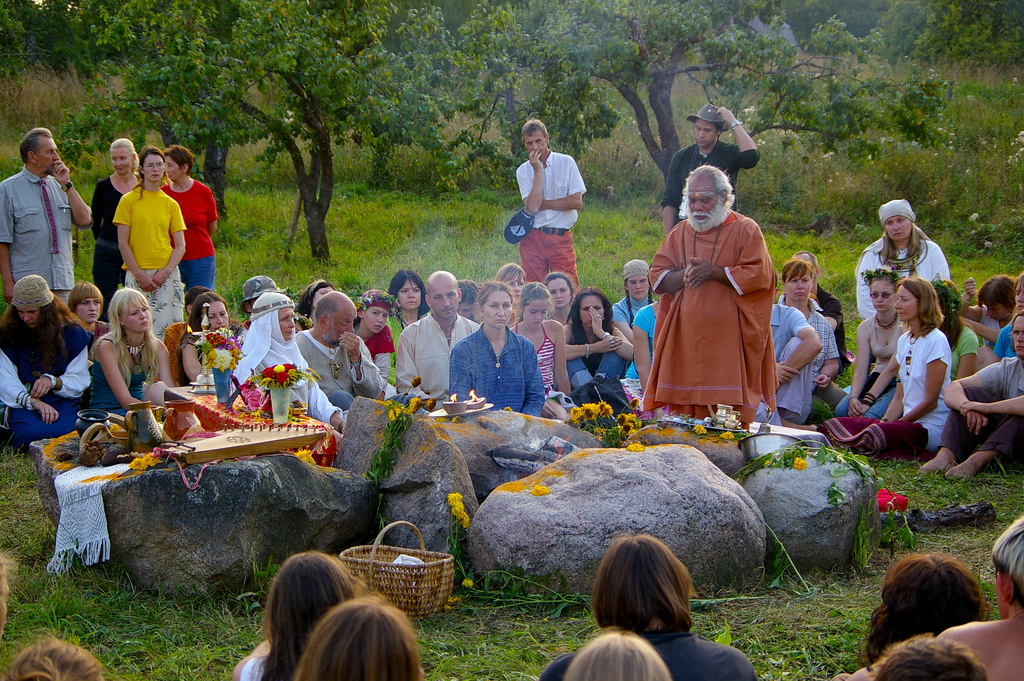
A Hindu priest officiating a Romuva ritual

Romuva and Hindu groups met for joint prayer and dialogue in Lithuania and abroad. Romuva leaders have participated in international forums such as the World Congress of Ethnic Religions.

== Notable Hindu Lithuanians ==
- Ieva Zasimauskaitė, a Lithuanian singer
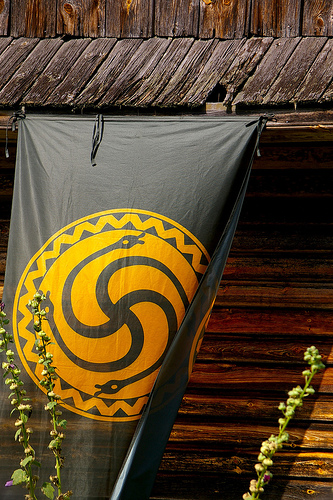
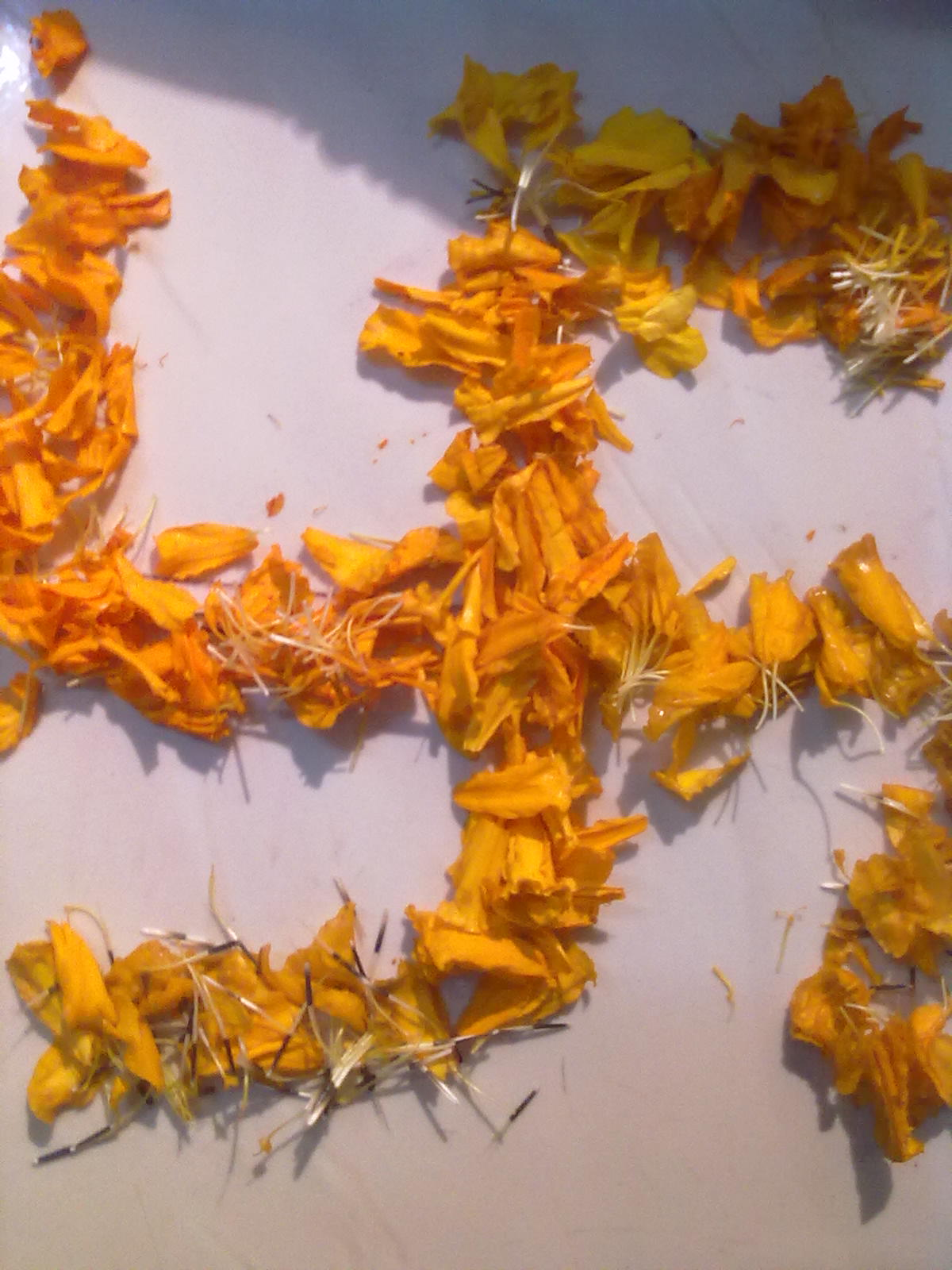
Similarities between Romuva flag (left) and Hindu Swastika symbol (right)

== See also ==
- Hinduism by country
- Religion in Lithuania
