= Art of Living =

Art of Living or The Art of Living may refer to:

- Art of Living Foundation, a volunteer-based, humanitarian and educational non-governmental organization
  - The Art of Living International Center, Bangalore, India
  - Art of Living Center (Los Angeles), U.S.
- The Art of Living, a long-running radio program and later a book by Norman Vincent Peale
- The Art of Living (film), a 1965 Spanish drama film
- The Art of Living, a 1965 book by Dietrich von Hildebrand with Alice von Hildebrand
- The Art of Living: Peace and Freedom in the Here and Now, a 2017 book by Vietnamese Buddhist monk Thích Nhất Hạnh
- Art of Living, a 1993 album and song by The Boomers (band)
- The Art of Living, a 1967 painting by René Magritte

== See also ==
- The Art of Living Long, a 1550 book of Luigi Cornaro
- Stoicism
