= Gurudev: On the Plateau of the Peak =

2018 biography by Bhanumathi Narasimhan

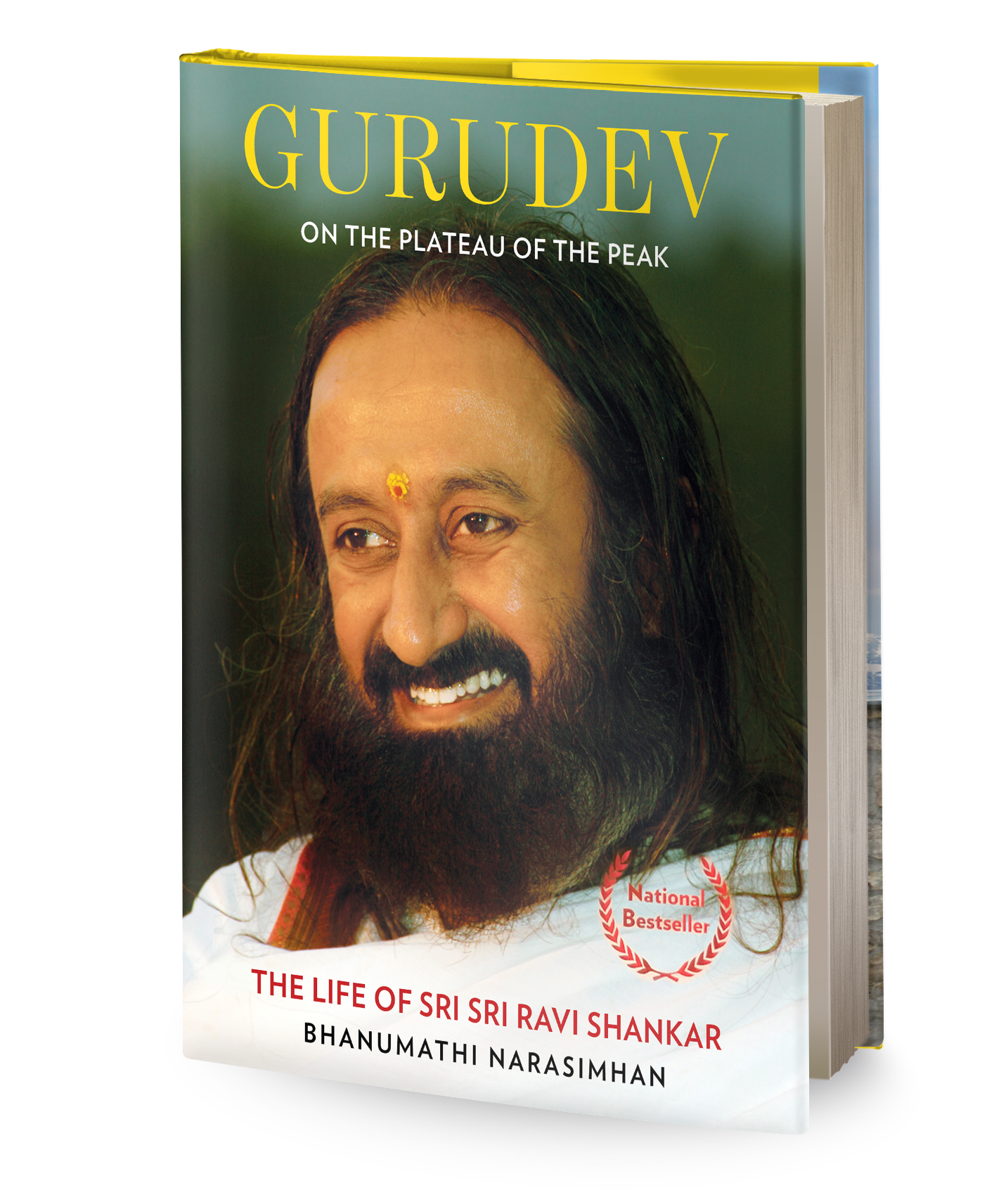
- Author: Bhanumathi Narasimhan
- Language: English, Hindi, Tamil, Bulgarian, Lithuanian, Bengali, Marathi, Spanish
- Subject: Biography & Autobiography of Sri Sri Ravi Shankar
- Genre: Non-fiction
- Publisher: Westland Publications
- Publication date: January 2018
- Publication place: India
- Media type: Print (hardcover / paperback)
- Pages: 207 pp
- Awards: Listed in Hindustan Times' Nielsen Top 10 lists, a prominent bestseller listing and retained its presence for months
- ISBN: 9789386850577 Other ISBN 938685080X, ISBN 9789386850577

Gurudev: On the Plateau of the Peak is a biography of Ravi Shankar, a spiritual leader and founder of The Art of Living Foundation. The author of the book is his sister Bhanumathi Narasimhan.

== Overview ==
Gurudev: On the Plateau of the Peak is about the life of Sri Sri Ravi Shankar from his childhood days to the days spent by him in the company of saints as a teenager, from being a young meditation teacher to a revered spiritual master.

The book begins with the story of the historic peace negotiations with the FARC in Havana, Cuba resulting in the FARC's new vision of non-violence. Tracing back to the beginning, the book jumps to Sri Sri Ravi Shankar's birth and tells about his childhood's incidents and also describes how his decision to take sanyas was received by his family.

His decision to start on his own, the creation of Sudarshan Kriya, his transformative art of breathing, his early teaching days, the beginning of The Art of Living ashram, his travels to various countries teaching The Art of Living programs to people from diverse walks of life, his choice to venture into the red zone in Iraq and the no-man's land in Sri Lanka to bring trauma relief, the promotion of yoga and meditation as a universal solution for healing and physical and mental peace, the World Cultural Festival where he brought together close to 3.5 million people in New Delhi, India in March 2016 to celebrate human values – the book shares anecdotes and insights associated with his life choices as a spiritual master and humanitarian.

== Editions ==
The book has been published in English (ISBN 9789386850577) in 2018 by Westland Publications. It has been translated into Hindi (ISBN 9789387578449), Tamil (ISBN 9789387578302), Bulgarian (ISBN 9789547339675), Lithuanian (ISBN 9786099507248), Marathi (ISBN 9789387894082), Bengali (ISBN 9789387894099), Kannada (ISBN 9789387578845), Spanish (ISBN 9789874177063), Portuguese (ISBN 9788561634209), Chinese (ISBN 9789671687109) and Bahasa (ISBN 9789386850577).

== Author ==
Bhanumathi Narasimhan was born in Papanasam, Tamil Nadu.
