= Swami Bhoomananda Tirtha =

Indian Spiritual Guru

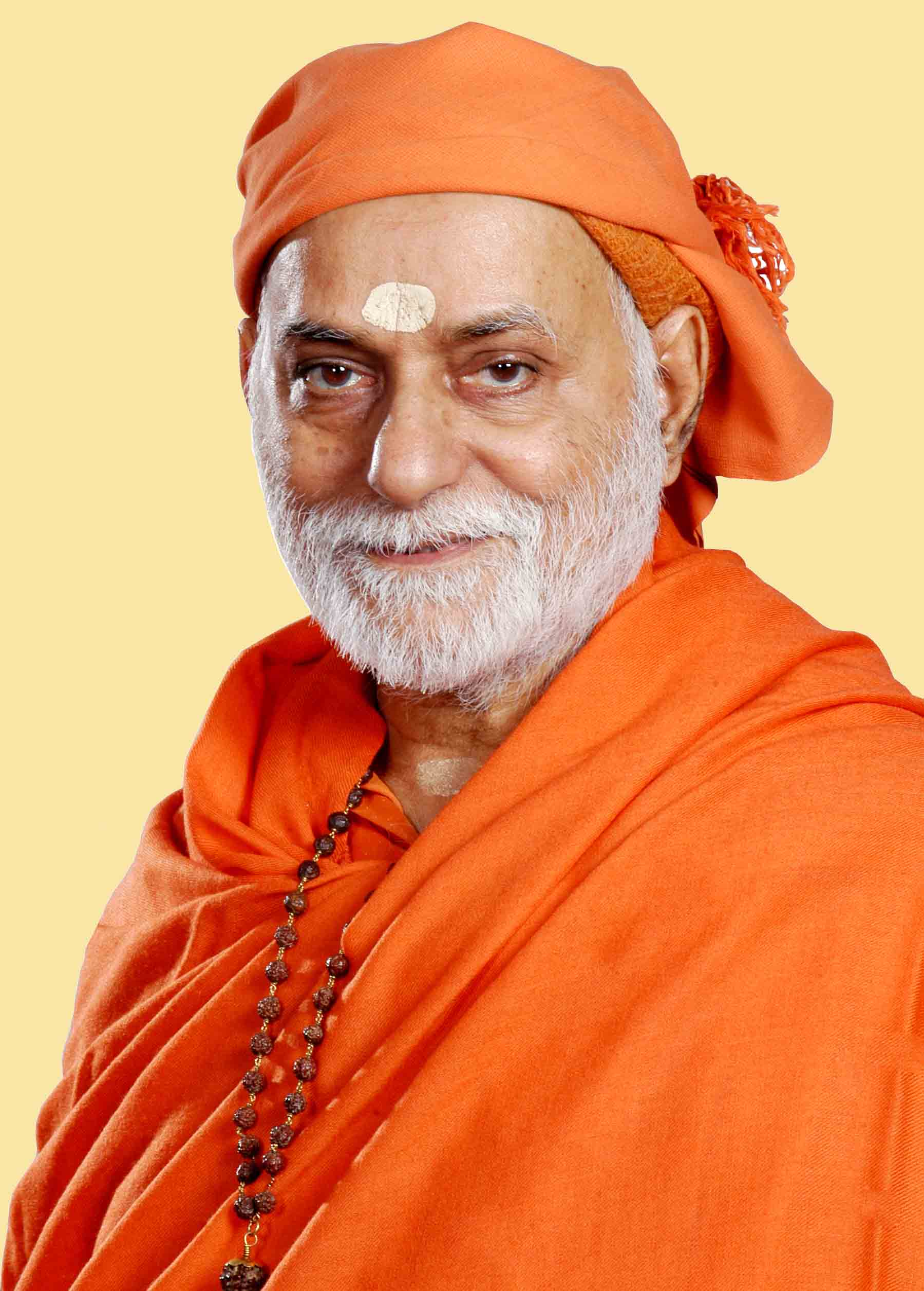

Personal life
- Born: May 13, 1933 (age 93) Parlikkad, Thrissur district, British India (now Kerala, India)
- Notable work(s): Brahmavidya Abhyasa, Essential Concepts in Bhagavad Gita, Insights into Bhagavad Gita, Divinizing Every Moment
- Known for: Brahmavidya dissemination, social reform, Vedanta discourses
- Website: bhoomananda.org

Religious life
- Religion: Hinduism
- Denomination: Advaita Vedanta

Religious career
- Teacher: Baba Gangadhara Paramahamsa
- Organization: Narayanashrama Tapovanam, CIRD

Swami Bhoomananda Tirtha (Devanagari: स्वामी भूमानन्द तीर्थ; Malayalam: സ്വാമി ഭൂമാനന്ദ തീര്‍ത്ഥ), is an Indian Spiritual Guru, Sannyasin, Vedanta exponent and social reformer. He is the founder of Narayanashrama Tapovanam and Centres for Inner Resources Development (CIRD).

Swamiji belongs to the Tirtha lineage instituted by Shankaracharya, and received Brahmavidyā initiation from Baba Gangadhara Paramahamsa of Dakshinkhanda (West Bengal). After a period of intense sādhanā he embraced sannyasa at the age of 23.

== Early life ==
Swami Bhoomananda Tirtha was born on 13 May 1933 in an orthodox Brahmin family in Paralikkad village, near Wadakkanchery, Thrissur district, Kerala, India, not far from Kalady, the birthplace of Adi Shankaracharya. He had his early education at Parlikad and later with his two brother Sanyasins started the Vyasa College, Parlikad.

The singular event that led Poojya Swamiji to seek spiritual discoveries was meeting his Gurudev Baba Gangadhara Paramahamsa. To pursue Brahmavidyā deeksha (initiation), he immersed himself in intense meditaton.

As his sādhanā became more intense, including focus on the Upanishads, he developed intense desire for Sannyāsa (renunciation). Swamiji has said that "Sannyāsa is not breaking away from the family relationships or banishing the loved ones from one’s “own” sphere. It is an expansion to own up everybody, a call to embrace the whole world. For such a person, the Upanishad says, the whole world becomes a single nest or abode."

As years passed, Poojya Swamiji’s focus shifted from Dhyāna nishtha (dedication to meditation) to Jnāna-nishtha (dedication to knowledge). In April 1964, Poojya Swamiji along with Mataji Sulabha Devi and a few devotees founded Narayanashrama Tapovanam on the eastern slope of the Pandavagiri Hill (Venginissery, Thrissur District).

== Activities ==
=== Jnaana Yajnas ===
The Jnaana Yajnas (knowledge dissemination programs) are a major part of Swami Bhoomananda Tirtha's Loka-sangraha (Welfare of the World) campaign. It consists of knowledge dissemination programmes through series of public discourses, workshops, retreats, sessions for youth and professionals, and living in the association of the Knower. The first Jnaana Yajna was held in Jamshedpur in 1964 and since then it has been held every year in different parts of the world organized by the Ashram and the CIRDs in India, Malaysia and USA. All the lecture programmes are now livestreamed on Youtube.

Global Bhagavad Gita Convention (GBGC)

This convention aims to bring the message of the Bhagavad Gita to people across the world. It was held in universities on the East and West Coasts of the USA from 2017 to 2019, and online in 2020 and 2022.

Parama Tattva Sameeksha Satram (PTSS)

This 10-day Knowledge Festival is conducted in Sabhaniketan, Naimishaaranyam, Paralikkad, Thrissur, Kerala, in which Saints and Scholars explain how the essential values of Śreemad Bhāgavatam can be applied to daily life. Thousands of devotees from rural and urban areas participate in this programme, which concludes with a Vishnusahasranama Samooha Archana and Yajna.

=== Socio-cultural reforms ===
Poojya Swamiji has been involved in a number of mass movements and legal campaigns from 1985 to 2005 to reform society and remove perceived degenerative practices from religious institutions. He is actively involved in petitioning the courts against torturing of temple elephants and illegal hill cutting.

Swami Bhoomananda Tirtha has conducted various movements for abolition of certain perceived offensive and unlawful rituals and practices that were followed by some Hindu temples. Prominent among these are the practice called Thookkam at the Elavur Puthankavu Temple in Ernakulam District, and the practice of singing obscene songs during the Bharani festival at the Kodungallur temple.

Charitable work

Swami Bhoomananda Tirtha has engaged in various forms of charitable work:

- Annual distribution of rice and clothing/blankets to indigent families on a large scale in Kerala as well as around CIRD-Delhi, CIRD-Jamshedpur, and tribal areas in Jharkhand, reaching about 38,000 families in 2019
- Flood and Covid-19 pandemic relief
- Support for Village Welfare
- Building houses for the homeless
- Providing educational materials at the beginning of the academic year and supporting higher studies

The intended purpose of arranging these Dāna programmes has been to grow societal awareness, promote equality, and give people the joy of human connection across various caste and community barriers.

== Organisation headquarters ==
Narayanashrama Tapovanam, the headquarters of Swami Bhoomananda Tirtha, is located at Venginissery village, 10 km South-West of Thrissur city. The Centres for Inner Resource Development (C.I.R.D), which are remote centres of the Ashram, are located in Delhi and Jamshedpur in India, and in Vienna in the US. The Society for Inner Resources Development (S.I.R.D) is based in Kuala Lumpur, Malaysia.

== Foundation for Restoration of National Values ==
Poojya Swamiji’s work has focused on cultivation of religious values to empower the individual and integrate them into society. His greatest concern has been the perceived crisis of value decline in India.

In 2007, he started contemplating launching a value restoration movement. The subject was discussed in Delhi with the members of CIRD-Delhi, and the “Foundation for Restoration of National Values” (FRNV) was registered as an independent society in June 2008 with Padma Vibhushan E Sreedharan (also known as “Metro Man” ) as the Chairperson. The advisory board of the FRNV includes former Indian Chief Justice M.N. Venkatachaliah, Tata Group chairman Ratan N.Tata, E Sreedharan, and N. Vittal. Through introduction of pilot projects on value education, environmental protection, and petitioning the Supreme Court on various national issues, the primary aims of FRNV have been:

- To transform and persuade the national leaders to address the perceived crisis of value decline
- To grow love and respect for India and its cultural values.
- To bring about changes in the mind and intelligence of people, the root cause of the perceived crisis

== Publications ==
=== Journal ===
Vicharasetu (Path of Introspection), the English monthly journal published by Swami Bhoomananda Tirtha, was started in 1968. Hindi and Malayalam versions of the Journal (Vicharasetu and Vicharasarani respectively) are also being published.

=== Books ===
Many books have been published by Swami Bhoomananda Tirtha in English, Malayalam, Hindi, Tamil and Bengali languages.

Title	ISBN (Paperback)	ISBN (Hardback)
Brahmavidya Abhyasa	ISBN 978-81-89588-01-4	ISBN 978-81-89588-02-1
Insights into Bhagavad Gita (70 GSM)	ISBN 978-93-80695-68-6	—
Insights into Bhagavad Gita (54 GSM)	ISBN 978-93-80695-68-6	—
A Great Association	ISBN 978-93-80695-62-4	—
Quietitude of the Mind	ISBN 978-93-80695-01-3	ISBN 978-93-80695-02-0
My Beloved Baba	ISBN 978-93-80695-06-8	ISBN 978-93-80695-07-5
Science of Inner Redemption, Vol. 1	ISBN 978-93-80695-39-6	ISBN 978-93-80695-40-2
Science of Inner Redemption, Vol. 2	ISBN 978-93-80695-49-5	ISBN 978-93-80695-50-1
Science of Inner Redemption, Vol. 3	ISBN 978-93-80695-56-3	ISBN 978-93-80695-57-0
Essential Concepts in Bhagavad Gita (ECBG), Vol. 1	ISBN 978-81-89588-08-3	ISBN 978-81-89588-09-0
Essential Concepts in Bhagavad Gita (ECBG), Vol. 2	ISBN 978-81-89588-04-5	ISBN 978-81-89588-05-2
Essential Concepts in Bhagavad Gita (ECBG), Vol. 3	ISBN 978-81-89588-15-1	ISBN 978-81-89588-16-8
Essential Concepts in Bhagavad Gita (ECBG), Vol. 4	ISBN 978-93-80695-03-7	ISBN 978-93-80695-04-4
Essential Concepts in Bhagavad Gita (ECBG), Vol. 5	ISBN 978-93-80695-17-4	ISBN 978-93-80695-18-1
Essential Concepts in Bhagavad Gita (ECBG), Vol. 6	ISBN 978-93-80695-24-2	ISBN 978-93-80695-25-9
In the Company of My Lord	ISBN 978-93-80695-21-1	ISBN 978-93-80695-22-8
Verses for Introspection, Vol. 1	ISBN 978-93-80695-45-7	—
Divinizing Every Moment	ISBN 978-81-89588-18-2	ISBN 978-81-89588-19-9
Dear and Blessed Soul	ISBN 978-93-80695-55-6	—
Prabhaata Rashmih, Vol. 1	ISBN 978-93-80695-05-1	ISBN 978-93-80695-23-5
Prabhaata Rashmih, Vol. 2	ISBN 978-81-89588-06-9	—
Prabhaata Rashmih, Vol. 3	ISBN 978-93-80695-48-8	—
Krishna as 24 Teachers	ISBN 978-93-80695-28-0	—
Vedantic Way of Living	ISBN 978-93-80695-16-7	—
Nityasamarpanam	ISBN 978-93-80695-53-2	—
Origin and Relevance of Vishnusahasranama	ISBN 978-93-80695-37-2	—
Vishnusahasranama Stotram Nammavali	ISBN 978-93-80695-52-5	—
Song of the Soul	ISBN 978-93-80695-00-6	—
Atmasudha	ISBN 978-93-80695-32-7	—
Restoring India to Her Glory	ISBN 978-93-80695-43-3	—
Genesis and Relevance of Temple Worship	ISBN 978-81-89588-03-8	—
Garland of Three Jewels	ISBN 978-93-80695-27-3	—
Worshipping the Lord Within	ISBN 978-93-80695-26-6	—
Secret of Devotional Enrichment	ISBN 978-93-80695-34-1	—
Words that Illumine, Book 1	No ISBN assigned	
Words that Illumine, Book 2	No ISBN assigned	
Sannyasa	No ISBN assigned	
Secret of Self Realization	ISBN 978-93-80695-31-0	—
To the Householder	ISBN 978-81-89588-00-7	—
Mere Pyare Baba	ISBN 978-93-80695-63-1	—
Atmanubhuti	No ISBN assigned	

== See also ==
- Narayanashrama Tapovanam
- Vedanta
- List of people from Kerala
