= Gurudeva =

Gurudeva is a generic address to a guru in Hinduism.

Gurudeva or Gurudev may also refer to:

- Gurudev (film), a 1993 Indian film
- Gurudeva (film), a 2005 Indian film
- Gurudev: On the Plateau of the Peak, a biography of Sri Sri Ravi Shankar
- Gurudev Chauraha metro station, Kanpur Metro, Uttar Pradesh, India
- Gurudev Express, Indian passenger train named after Rabindranath Tagore and Narayana Guru
- Gurudev Siddha Peeth, an Indian ashram, associated with Bhagawan Nityananda

People:

- Gurudev Gupta, Indian politician and journalist
- R. B. Gurudev, Indian cinematographer
- Gurudev Gupta (1919–2000), Indian politician
- Bhagawan Nityananda, (1897–1961), Indian guru, known as Sri Gurudev, see Gurudev Siddha Peeth above
- Narayana Guru (1856–1928), Indian social reformer, known as Gurudeva
- Rabindranath Tagore (1861–1941), Indian writer and poet, known by the honorific Gurudev
- Ravi Shankar (spiritual leader), Indian spiritual leader

== See also ==
- Gurudev Hoysala, an Indian Kannada-language film
- Guru (disambiguation)
- Deva (disambiguation)
