= Narayanashrama Tapovanam =

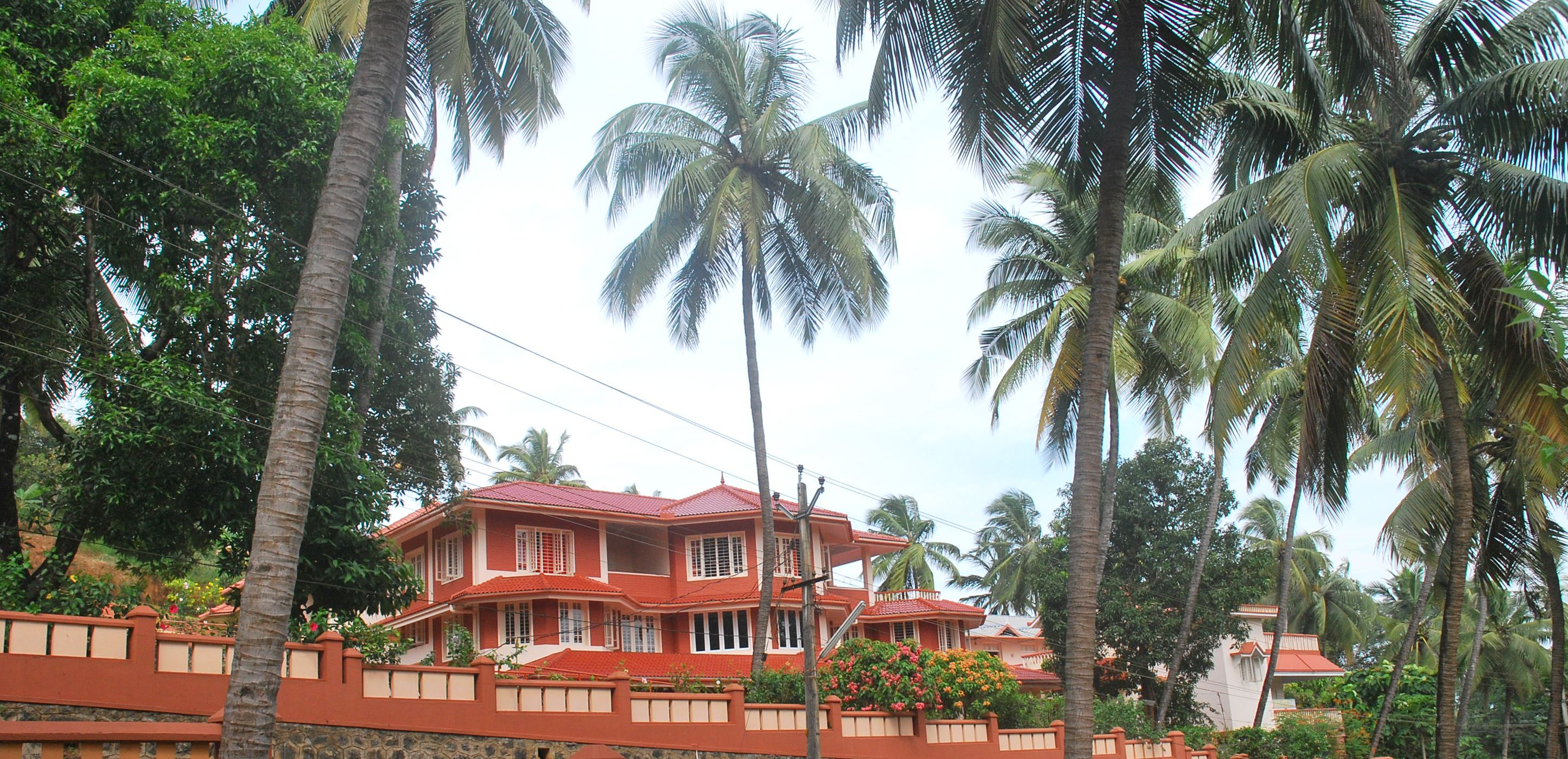
Front View of the Ashram

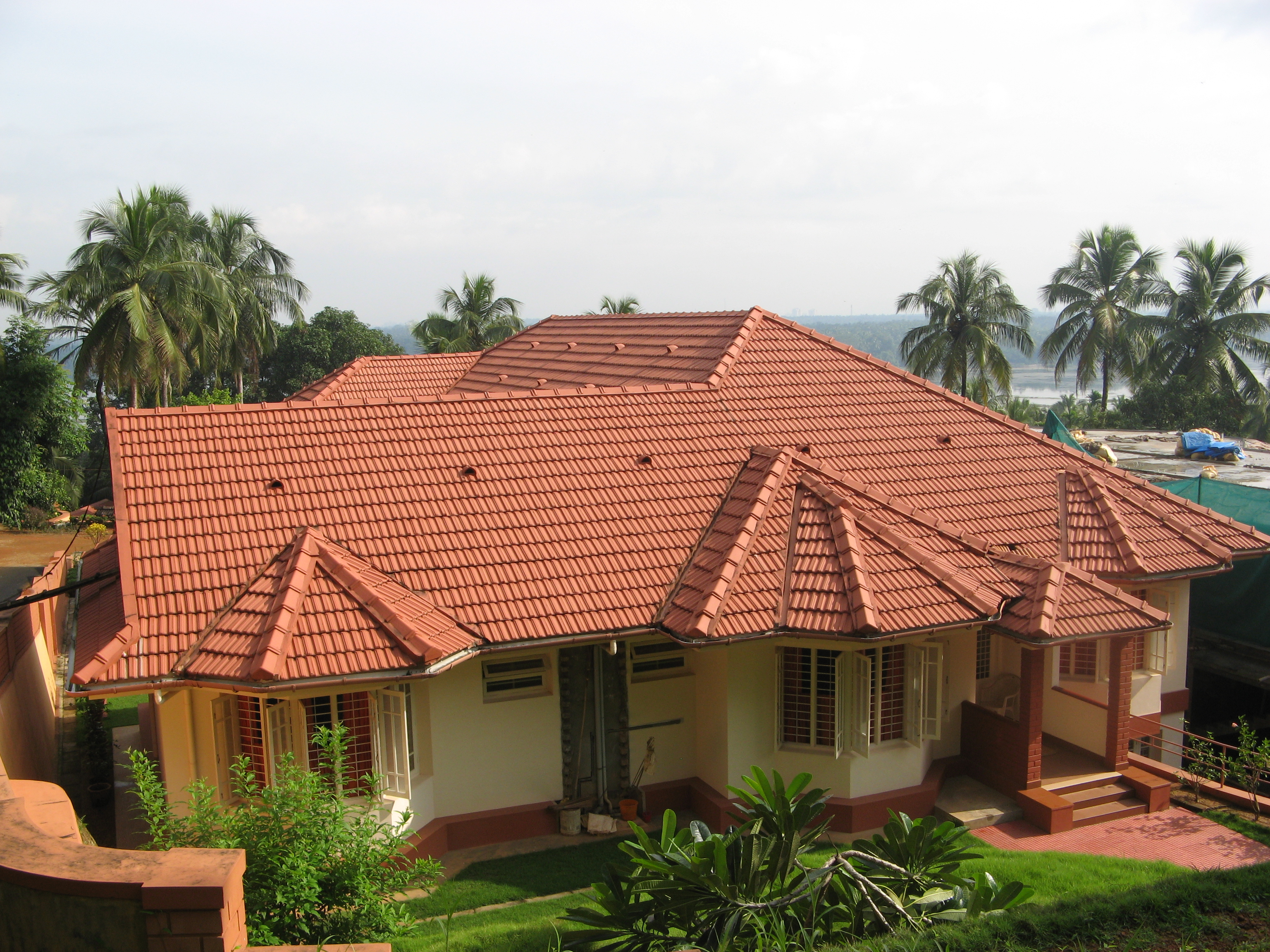
Another view of the Ashram

Narayanashrama Tapovanam is an Ashram located at Venginissery village, 10 km South-West of Thrissur city, in Kerala state, India. It was founded by Swami Bhoomananda Tirtha in 1963. The Ashram, which is located in the hillock of Pandava Giri, is a centre for learning and practising Brahmavidya and Vedanta.

The Ashram conducts classes, workshops, discourses interactive Satsangs etc., to explain the messages of Bhagavad Gita, Srimad Bhagavatam, Upanishads and other spiritual Textures, highlighting their application in practical life situations. It has also organized and supported movements for restoration and preservation of traditional and national values, environmental protection, abolition of derogatory practices followed by certain Hindu temples, educational and cultural uplifting of rural children and welfare of the neighbouring villages.

== Major activities of the Ashram ==
=== Spiritual knowledge dissemination ===
Jnaana Yajnas: The Ashram conducts Jnaana Yajnas regularly in different locations, under the patronage of Swami Bhoomananda Tirtha, to disseminate knowledge of the ancient spiritual textures of India. The first Jnaana Yajna was held in Jamshedpur in 1964. Afterwards, in addition to Jamshedpur, these are held regularly in other Indian cities like Delhi, Mumbai, Chennai, and Bangalore, as well as in Malaysia and the U.S.A.

‘Srimad Bhagavata Tattva Sameeksha Satram’: This 2 week long elucidation, which details the essential values and ideals of Srimad Bhagavatam, is held in Parlikad in Thrissur district in the month of December every year. It is attended by a large number of people.

Gita Tattva Sameeksha: It includes a series of discourses on Bhagavad Gita, and is conducted every year in Thrissur, in which Swami Bhoomananda Tirtha describes the essence and contents of the texture. The event is being held every year since 1995.

Residential Program on Experiential Vedanta: The Ashram conducts a residential program of 3 months’ duration on Experiential Vedanta every year. The program focuses on the role of scriptural knowledge in spiritual saadhana (practice), and learning spiritual texts like Bhagavad Gita, Upanishads, Vivekachoodamani and Srimad Bhagavatam.

=== Publications (books and CDs) ===
The Ashram has published many spiritual books authored by Swami Bhoomananda Tirtha. Many audio and video CDs/DVDs of various discourses, chanting of Vedic hymns etc. have also been published. Vicharasetu (Path of Introspection) an English monthly journal edited by Swami Bhoomananda Tirtha, was started in 1968. It contains articles, correspondence, and summary of discourses by Swami Bhoomananda Tirtha, Swami Nirviseshananda Tirtha and Ma Gurupriya. Hindi and Malayalam versions of the Journal (Vicharasetu and Vicharasarani respectively) are also being published.

=== Social welfare activities and socio-cultural reforms ===
The Ashram conducts classes for children on cultural, moral and traditional values. It also organizes ‘Anna-Vastra Daana Satrams’, where rice, clothing etc. are distributed among needy families. Villagers are also provided help in generating self-employment, education, medical treatment.

Led by Swami Bhoomananda Tirtha, the Ashram has stood for abolition of certain unlawful and derogatory practices that were being followed by certain Hindu temples in Kerala. The practice of ‘Thookkam’ at Elavur Puthankavu temple in Ernakulam district, and the singing of obscene songs at the Kodungallur Bharani festival are among them.

== Knowledge dissemination centres ==
The Ashram has the following satellite centres, carrying out its mission in the respective areas.

Centre for Inner Resources Development, Delhi, India

Centre for Inner Resources Development, Jamshedpur, India

Centre for Inner Resources Development, Vienna, Virginia, U.S.A

Society for Inner Resources Development, Kuala Lumpur, Malaysia

== See also ==
- Swami Bhoomananda Tirtha
- Vedanta
- List of people from Kerala
