= Arts Council of Pakistan Karachi =

Pakistani non-profit organisation

- شورای فنون پاکستان کراچی
- Abbreviation: ACPKHI
- Formation: 1948
- Type: Non-Profit Organisation
- Legal status: Registered Society
- Purpose: Promotion of Arts and Culture
- Headquarters: M.R. Kiyani Road, Saddar Town, Karachi
- Coordinates: 24.853044°N 67.020908°E
- Region served: Pakistan
- Key people: Mohammad Ahmed Shah (President)
- Employees: 350 (2021)
- Website: acpkhi.com

The Arts Council of Pakistan, Karachi (Note: Urdu: شورای فنون پاکستان کراچی), abbreviated as ACPKHI, is a non-profit organisation in Karachi, Pakistan, dedicated to the promotion of performing and fine arts. Its activities include theatre productions, dance and music academies, literary conferences, talent competitions, and other cultural events. The council's programmes are intended to be accessible to a broad range of audiences and of diverse segments of society.

Founded in 1948 as an institution for the advancement of arts and culture, it is among the oldest and most prominent non-governmental organisations in Pakistan in this field. Hosting a high volume of events each year, the council plays a role in preserving and fostering the country's artistic traditions.

Unlike the Lahore Arts Council and other government-run counterparts, ACPKHI as an independent NGO, holding leadership elections every two years. This autonomy from government funding and oversight allows it to maintain creative independence, apply selective self-censorship, and promote a wide range of cultural expression without direct political influence.

In addition to its work in theatre, literature, and music, the Arts Council has expanded into fashion design and filmmaking. It provides subsidised or, in some cases, free access to its auditoriums, studios, and technical facilities for young creatives, addressing the limited availability of affordable training and platforms in these fields.

== History and background ==
In 1948, a group of art enthusiasts gathered and formed themselves into a society under the name of Karachi Fine Arts Society. It was first of its kind to promote and encourage arts and culture in Pakistan. It held exhibitions and promoted activities relating to theatre.

The society's funds were contributed personally by its members, and it did not have a permanent building. Meetings were therefore held at the residences of office bearers, while art exhibitions took place in rented rooms within private houses. In 1954, six years after its founding, the Karachi Fine Arts Society was reorganised as the Arts Council of Pakistan, Karachi, and registered with the Registrar of Societies, Karachi, under Act XXI of 1860. The registration certificate was issued on 10 May 1955. Following its establishment, the Arts Council expanded its activities in the promotion of arts and culture.

The auditorium, once seldom used, was revitalised in 2003 when it was offered at a nominal cost as a venue for the 3rd KaraFilm Festival. The festival's presence led to upgrades in sound, lighting, and other technical facilities, and drew new audiences to the Arts Council, helping to transform its reputation from that of an exclusive club to an accessible cultural centre.

The council has also sponsored theatrical and musical productions. In 2017, for instance, it hosted a musical tribute in its auditorium to Bade Fateh Ali Khan, a renowned Pakistani classical vocalist.

== Academies at Arts Council of Pakistan, Karachi ==
Karachi Arts Council has four academies of its own that help in fostering raw talent and developing them into real performers." These include:

=== Theatre Academy ===
It helps in teaching script-writing, directing, acting, cinematography, editing, and production management.

=== Music Academy ===
It helps in the teaching of violin playing, flute playing, dholak playing, vocals training, guitar playing and other classical instruments.

=== Fine Arts Academy ===
It helps in teaching and developing literature, floral art, architecture, interior designing, and sculpture.

== International Cultural Exchange ==
The council organises the World Culture Festival, which brings together performers and artists from over 120 countries on a shared platform. The event serves as a venue for intercultural exchange and representation, operating independently of official government cultural diplomacy.

== Facilities ==
Following are some facilities offered by the Arts Council of Pakistan for hosting events:

- Auditorium
- Open Air Theatre
- Permanent Art Gallery
- Library / Reading Room
- Audio / Visual Library
- Cultural Café

== Recent local body elections ==
In 2005, Arts Council of Pakistan had over 4000 members and over 3000 eligible voters. Arts Council of Pakistan elections for office-holders were to be held on 18 December 2005.

On 18 December 2016, latest Arts Council of Pakistan elections were to be held for office-holders.

== See also ==
- National Academy of Performing Arts (Pakistan), also located nearby in Karachi
