= The Art of Living International Center =

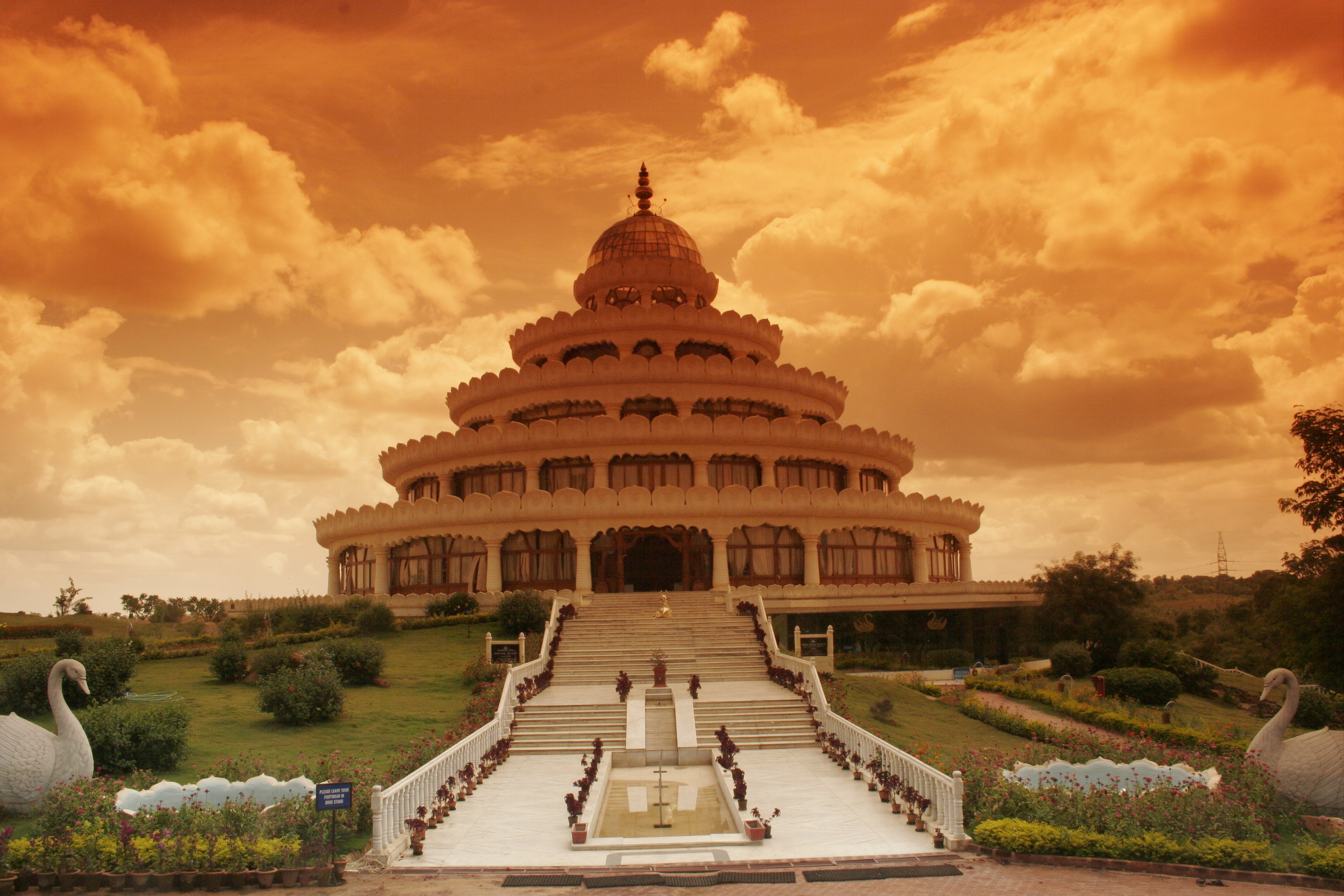
- The Art of Living International Center in Bengaluru, India

- Location in India

Religion
- Affiliation: Hinduism
- Festivals: Mahashivratri, Navratri
- Governing body: Art of Living

Location
- Location: 21st Km, Udaypura, Kanakapura Road, Bengaluru
- State: Karnataka
- Country: India
- Coordinates: 12°49′31″N 77°30′30″E

Architecture
- Creator: Ravi Shankar
- Established: 1986

The Art of Living International Center is the headquarters of the Art of Living Foundation.

== History ==
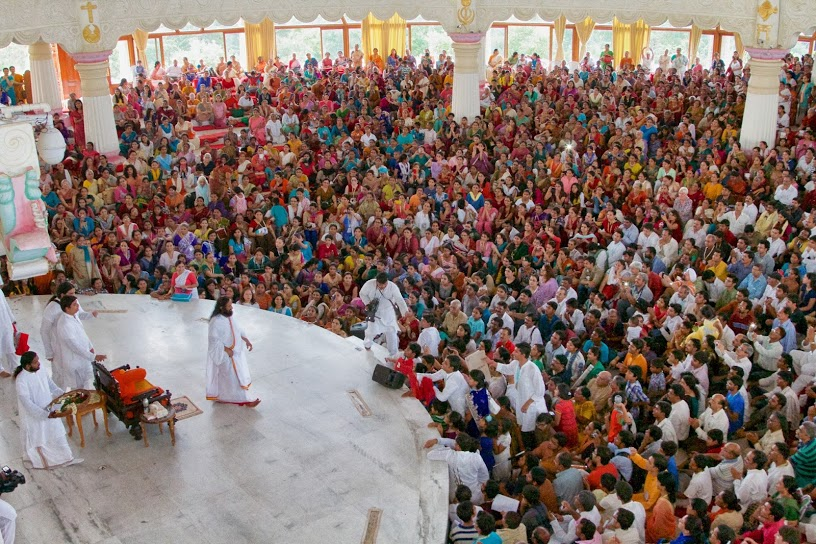
Satsang held by Sri Sri Ravi Shankar at the Vishalakshi Mantap.

The center was established in 1986 near Bangalore, India, by Ravi Shankar to offer a base for the Art of Living Foundation.

== Facilities ==
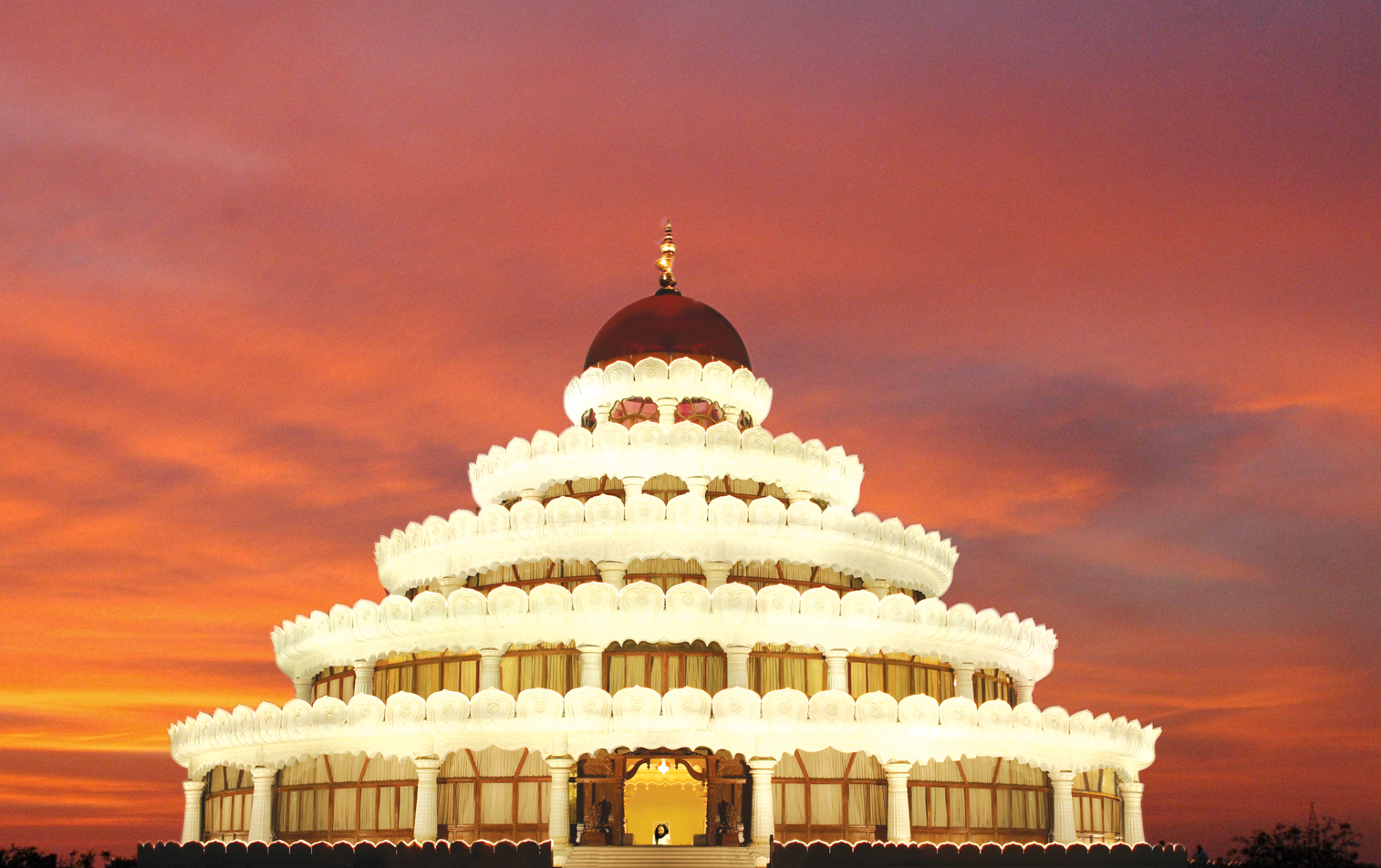
Vishalakshi Mantap

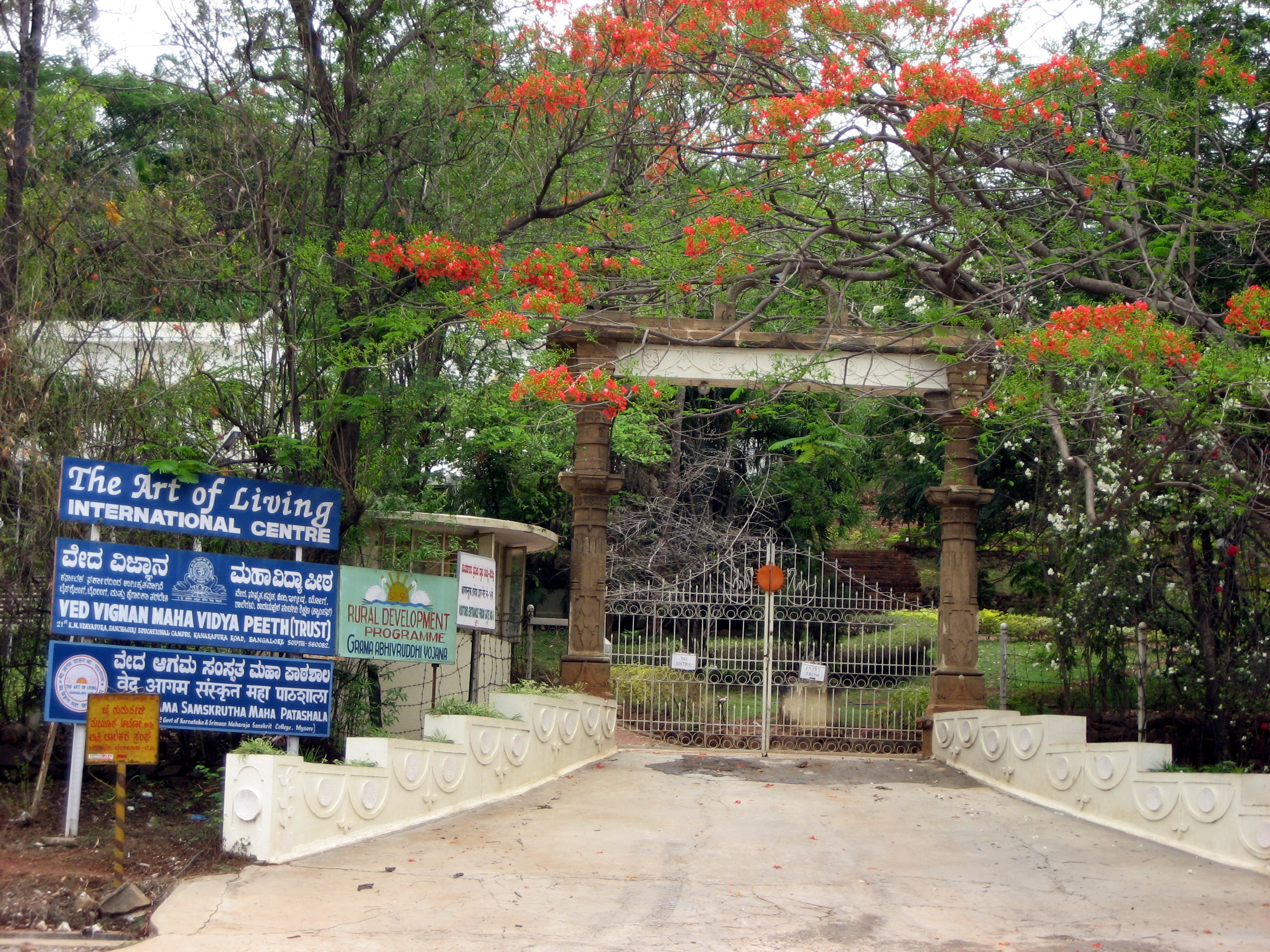
One of the side gates of the campus

=== Vishalakshi Mantap ===
The Vishalakshi Mantap was inaugurated by Vice President Bhairon Singh Shekhawat on January 17, 2003. The structure includes a meditation hall consisting of five tiers with designs of lotus petals surrounding it, and has a capacity of 25,000 people.

=== Ayurveda hospital ===
Sri Sri College of Ayurvedic Science & Research Hospital is a 172-bed Ayurveda Hospital.

=== Sri Sri Gaushala ===
A cow shelter where visitors can interact with and care for cows, promoting a sense of connection with nature.

== Connectivity ==
Nearest Airport : Bengaluru The journey from Kempegowda International Airport (BLR) to The Art of living International Center is approximately 55 kilometers.

== Litigation ==
In 2011, a public-interest litigation petition filed in the Karnataka High Court alleged that some of the center's structures encroached on the Udipalya tank. The government of Karnataka found on inspection that the center had encroached on 6.53 hectares (16.1 acres) of the tank area and issued a show-cause notice.
