= World Meditation Day =

United Nations December observance

World Meditation Day was declared by United Nations General Assembly on 6 December 2024 to be observed on December 21 of every year, after its draft resolution which was co-sponsored by India was unanimously got adopted by all the members. The resolution was introduced by Liechtenstein and in addition to India was supported by Bangladesh, Bulgaria, Burundi, the Dominican Republic, Iceland, Luxembourg, Mauritius, Monaco, Mongolia, Morocco, Portugal, and Slovenia. The days is observed to promoted physical, mental, and emotional well-being among people.

== Significance ==
World Meditation Day was declared to be organised every year on December 21 in the December'6 resolution of the United Nations as its draft resolution was adopted Unanimously by its General Assembly which was co-sponsored by India. It is believed that on this day, the Sun appears on its southernmost position on the sky due to Earth axial tilt which results in the year's shortest day and longest night for the Northern Hemisphere.

== Member countries ==
World Meditation Day resolution was introduced by Liechtenstein and was supported by India, Bangladesh, Bulgaria, Burundi, the Dominican Republic, Iceland, Luxembourg, Mauritius, Monaco, Mongolia, Morocco, Portugal, and Slovenia.

== Purpose ==
World Meditation Day resolution was adopted to help focus on broader goals of United Nations under Sustainable Goal 3,which promotes well being for all age groups by focussing on healthy life-style.

== Events ==
World Meditation Day is organized by many international spiritual organizations, including Heartfulness, Art of Living, and one of the most scientifically researched meditation techniques, Transcendental Meditation (TM). TM is recommended by the American Heart Association as a complementary approach for reducing stress and supporting cardiovascular health, and has been proven through extensive scientific research to deliver measurable results in improving mental and physical well-being.

While TM is a specific meditation technique, World Meditation Day is a UN-proclaimed global observance held on December 21, encouraging everyone to meditate for their mental and physical well-being. Practices such as TM are included in the broader celebration of this day, and leaders of the TM movement, including Dr. Tony Nader (neuroscientist, author and President of Maharishi International University (MIU)) and Dr. John Hagelin (quantum physicist, former President of MIU, now President Emeritus), have participated in United Nations-related events and dialogues promoting meditation as a tool for global peace and collective harmony.

The day aims to raise awareness of the benefits of meditation and to promote both individual and global harmony through collective practice. Many other institutions and meditation communities around the world also join this global event.

https://worldmeditationday.world/

== See also ==
- Different types of Meditation.
