= Gurudev Gupta =

Indian politician and journalist

Member of Parliament, Rajya Sabha
- In office 1960-66 ,1976-82
- Constituency: Madhya Pradesh

Personal details
- Born: 14 January 1919
- Died: 12 November 2000 (aged 81)
- Party: Indian National Congress
- Spouse: Somvati Gupta
- Children: Asha Singh, Aruna Bishnoi, Madan Mohan Gupta, Hari Mohan Gupta, Rajiv Mohan Gupta, Archana Gupta and Sanjeev Mohan Gupta

Gurudev Gupta was an Indian politician and renowned journalist. He was a Member of Parliament, representing Madhya Pradesh in the Rajya Sabha the upper house of India's Parliament as a member of the Indian National Congress. He along with his brothers Shri Pooranchand Gupta and Shri J C Arya established the Hindi daily newspaper "Dainik Jagran" in 1942 from Jhasi. Today the said newspaper is a mega brand in the print media industry of India and is the largest circulated newspaper of the country.
