= Sudarshan Kriya =

Yogic breathing technique

- Type: Breathing exercise, pranayama
- Founder: Sri Sri Ravi Shankar
- Origin: Shimoga, Karnataka, India
- Date: September 1981
- Organization: Art of Living Foundation
- Philosophy: Yoga, meditation
- Purpose: Stress management, emotional regulation

Sudarshan Kriya (Sanskrit: सुदर्शन क्रिया, su-darśana kriyā), often abbreviated SKY for Sudarshan Kriya Yoga, is a cyclical controlled-breathing practice rooted in pranayama. It was introduced in 1981 by Sri Sri Ravi Shankar and is taught as the central practice of courses run by the Art of Living Foundation, a non-profit organisation.

The name combines the Sanskrit words su ("proper"), darshan ("vision") and kriya ("action" or "purifying action"). The practice uses breathing at varying rates and is taught by the foundation for stress reduction and emotional regulation. It has been studied in peer-reviewed research for its effects on the autonomic nervous system, stress hormones such as cortisol, and symptoms of depression and other conditions, though reviewers have generally concluded that larger and more rigorous trials are needed to confirm clinical efficacy.

== History ==
Ravi Shankar introduced Sudarshan Kriya in 1981 and presented it as the main practice of the Art of Living Foundation, which he founded the following year. According to his own account, the breathing sequence came to him after a ten-day period of silence near Shimoga, Karnataka, and the first instructional course took place there the same year.

The practice spread internationally through the foundation's courses during the 1980s. From the late 1990s it became a subject of clinical and academic research, including studies at the National Institute of Mental Health and Neurosciences (NIMHANS) in Bengaluru that examined its effects in depressive disorders. In 2005, Richard P. Brown and Patricia L. Gerbarg published a two-part review proposing a neurophysiological model for Sudarshan Kriya and related yogic breathing in the treatment of stress, anxiety and depression.

== Technique ==
Sudarshan Kriya is taught as a sequence of four components. It begins with Ujjayi ("victorious breath"), a slow technique of about two to four breaths per minute in which a slight constriction of the throat increases airway resistance and lengthens each phase of the breath. This is followed by Bhastrika ("bellows breath"), rapid and forceful inhalation and exhalation at a rate of about 30 breaths per minute. The syllable "Om" is then chanted with prolonged exhalation. The sequence closes with the Sudarshan Kriya itself, a cyclical pattern of slow, medium and fast breathing that gives the practice its name.

Proponents describe the breath as a link between the body and the mind, and suggest that specific breathing rhythms can influence emotional states. The reviews by Brown and Gerbarg and by Zope and Zope relate the slow and fast phases to changes in vagal tone and autonomic balance, proposing that Ujjayi shifts activity toward parasympathetic dominance while Bhastrika produces transient sympathetic activation.

== Research ==
Sudarshan Kriya has been examined in clinical and physiological studies, many of them small pilot trials. Reviews describe it as a low-cost practice that may serve as a complementary or adjunct intervention, while noting that the evidence base is limited by small sample sizes, varying methodological quality and reliance on self-reported outcomes.

=== Physiological effects ===
Research has focused on autonomic regulation and biochemical markers of stress. A controlled study by Sharma and colleagues reported that regular practitioners had lower blood lactate levels and higher activity of antioxidant enzymes than non-practitioners. A later study by the same group reported differences in the expression of antioxidant and stress-related genes in immune cells of practitioners. Other work has reported changes in heart rate variability and in serum cortisol, though findings have not been consistent across studies.

=== Mental health ===
In a NIMHANS trial, Sudarshan Kriya was compared with electroconvulsive therapy and the antidepressant imipramine in patients with melancholic depression; remission rates with the breathing practice were lower than with electroconvulsive therapy but comparable to imipramine. A randomized study of alcohol-dependent individuals reported reductions in depression scores accompanied by hormonal changes. A pilot study in patients with major depressive disorder who had responded inadequately to antidepressants reported a reduction in symptoms relative to a waitlist control.

The practice has also been studied for post-traumatic stress disorder (PTSD). A trial among survivors of the 2004 Indian Ocean earthquake and tsunami reported reductions in PTSD and depression symptoms, and a small randomized study of United States military veterans of the wars in Iraq and Afghanistan reported reduced PTSD symptoms and a lower respiration rate in the active group, with effects persisting at one-year follow-up. A 2024 randomized clinical trial of 129 physicians reported reductions in stress, anxiety, depression and insomnia scores compared with a stress-management education control.

Systematic reviews have found that, while several trials report positive effects on mood and stress, the overall evidence is of mixed quality and that larger, well-controlled randomized trials are required before firm conclusions can be drawn.

== See also ==
- Pranayama
- Yoga as therapy
- Art of Living Foundation
