= Parlikad =

- village
- Location in Kerala, India Parlikad (India)
- Coordinates: 10.6407100°N 76.2136500°E
- Country: India
- State: Kerala
- District: Thrissur
- Talukas: Talappilly

Government
  - Body: Village

Languages
  - Official: Malayalam, English
- Time zone: UTC+5:30 (IST)
- PIN: 680623
- Vehicle registration: KL-
- Nearest city: Thrissur
- Lok Sabha constituency: Ottapalam
- Vidhan Sabha constituency: Wadakkanchery
- Civic agency: Village
- Climate: tropical (Köppen)

Parlikad is a village in Thrissur district in the state of Kerala, India.
