= World Cultural Festival =

Global event promoting cultural diversity

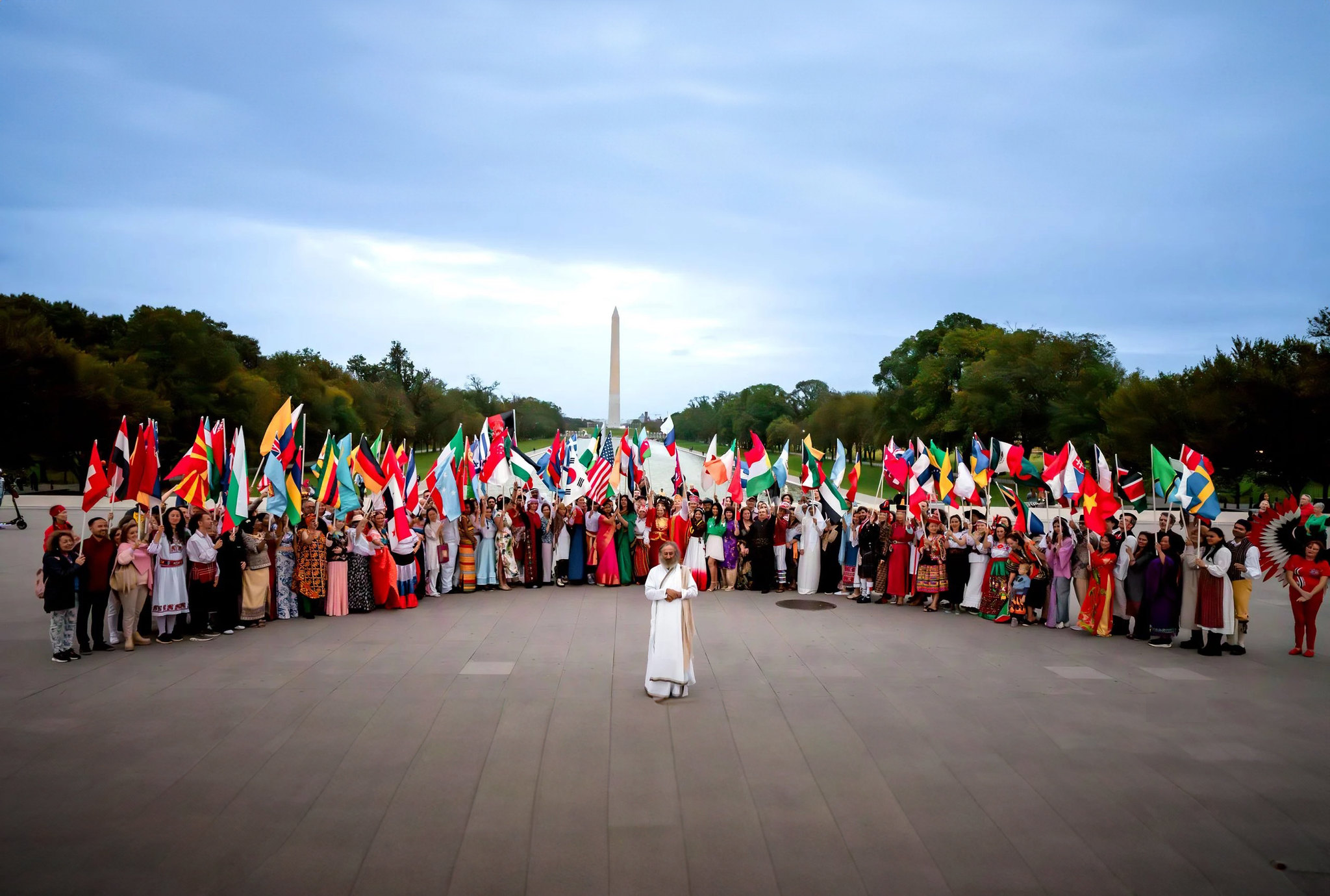
- Ravi Shankar with the performers at World Cultural Festival 2023 held in Washington DC
- Status: active
- Genre: festivals
- Dates: 2011 (Berlin), 2016 (New Delhi), 2023 (Washington DC)
- Locations: New Delhi, Berlin, Bangalore, Washington, DC
- Country: India, Germany, United States
- Founder: Ravi Shankar
- Most recent: 28 September 2023 to 1 October 2023
- Attendance: 2.1 million (average)
- Major events: Music; Dance; Meditation; Cuisine
- Organiser: The Art of Living Foundation

Ravi Shankar founded The World Culture Festival (WCF), an international event series to promote global unity through the principle of Vasudhaiva Kutumbakam ("The world is one family"). Each festival has showcased global culture and a collective expression since its inception.

The Art of Living, a humanitarian non-governmental organization takes on the responsibility to organize these festivals that feature high-level keynote addresses by world leaders, cultural performances by many international artists, and large-scale guided meditations intended to foster a sense of inner and outer peace.

== History ==
The inaugural edition was held in 2006 to mark the foundation's 25th anniversary. The festival expanded internationally with editions in Berlin (2011), New Delhi (2016), and Washington, D.C. (2023).

Year	Location	Dates	Attendance	Notes
2006	Bengaluru, India	17–19 February	2.5 million	Silver Jubilee Celebrations (25 years of Art of Living)
2011	Olympic Stadium, Berlin, Germany	2–3 July	60,000–70,000	30th anniversary celebration
2016	New Delhi, India	11–13 March	3.5 million (including 36,000 artists)	35th anniversary;
2023	National Mall, Washington, D.C., United States	29 September – 1 October	1 million	First edition held in the United States

== Editions ==
=== 2006 ===
To celebrate the 25th anniversary of The Art of Living, it organized the first World Culture Festival in Bangalore in 2006. The venue was the Jakkur Aerodrome in Bangalore, India. Centered on the theme Vasudhaiva Kutumbakam ("The world is one family"), this edition of the festival was considered the largest peaceful gathering, with an estimated attendance of 2.5 million people from over 110 countries.

The festival was graced by many significant dignitaries, including 100+ spiritual leaders and prominent global political leaders. The list included President A.P.J. Abdul Kalam, Vice President Bhairon Singh Shekhawat, and former Prime Minister Atal Bihari Vajpayee. Global leaders like the King of Ghana and the presidents of Fiji and Mauritius.

A “Grand Musical Symphony" was organised. This Symphony included 3,800 musicians performing simultaneously. The collective included 920 veenas, 888 mridangams, 822 violins, and 900 flutes. Well-known Indian classical maestros Dr. M. Balamuralikrishna and Lalgudi Jayaraman also performed, alongside international artist Peter Maffay. The festival came to a close with a mass meditation session led by Sri Sri Ravi Shankar, praying for world peace.

=== 2011 ===
The Art of Living Foundation commemorated its 30th anniversary with the second World Culture Festival that took place from July 2–3, 2011, at the Olympiastadion in Berlin, Germany. This version of the event aimed to promote global peace and intercultural dialogue through music, dance, and meditation.

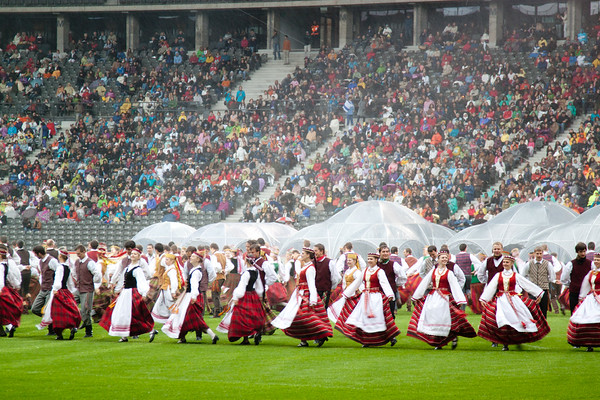

The festival hosted participants and performers from over 151 countries with a turnout of 70,000 people. The event was attended by 804 dignitaries, including ministers, members of parliament, and ambassadors. Notable attendees included Prof. Ruud Lubbers (Former Prime Minister of the Netherlands), Nitin Gadkari (President of the Bharatiya Janata Party), and Subodh Kant Sahay (Minister for Tourism, India). Additional international representation included Sheikh Fahad of Kuwait, Abul Kalam Azad (Minister for Information and Cultural Affairs, Bangladesh), and Ayoob Kara (Deputy Minister for Development, Israel). Congratulatory messages were sent by global figures, including Nancy Pelosi, The President of India, and Prime Minister Manmohan Singh.

The proceedings commenced with Vedic chants followed by the German national anthem and the European anthem, "Ode to Joy." Despite the rain during the event, the program continued. During his speech, Sri Sri Ravi Shankar spoke in both German and English, telling the crowd that "it is time that walls come down between cultures. 800 experts performed synchronised yogasanas and surya namaskars led by Sri Sri Ravi Shankar.

2016

In 2016, the festival was held on the Yamuna floodplains in New Delhi from 11 to 13 March.

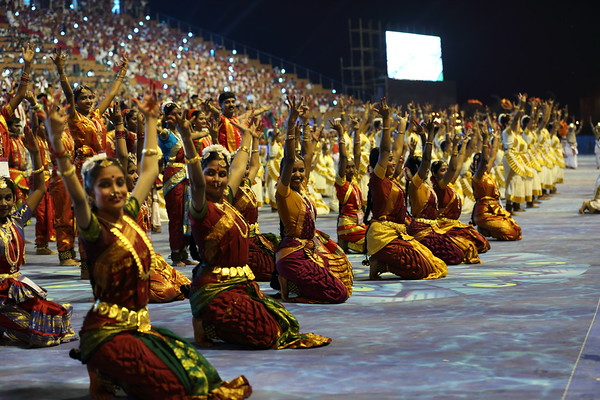
World Culture Festival 2016

It was organised by Sri Sri Ravi Shankar to celebrate the Art of Living Foundation's 35 years in service. Attendance was estimated at around 3.5 million people in audience and 37,000 artists over 3 days. The performances were held on a 100 feet tall by 1,200 feet wide stage with an area of seven acres. Around 1,700 officials were deployed for traffic management, during the festival, and around 300 were on standby for the other events (specifically marriages) to be held during the festival.

In 2016, the festival was chaired by Justice RC Lahoti. Dr. Boutros Boutros-Ghali from United Nations was also listed as a co-chair for the event but he died prior to the event. Some other committee members included former Dutch Prime Minister Ruud Lubbers; Nancy Pelosi, Katherine Clark and Ed Witfield from United States Congress; and former Lithuanian president Vytautas Landsbergis.

Following the 2016 edition, Australian Prime Minister Malcolm Turnbull invited Art of Living Foundation to Australia for the next World Culture Festival.

=== 2023 ===
In March 2023, the Art Of Living Foundation announced their next WFC event to be held in Washington, DC from 29 September to 1 October 2023. By September 29, 2023, more than 600,000 people registered to attend at least one day of the event. WFC 2023 featured 17,000 performers from more than 100 countries.

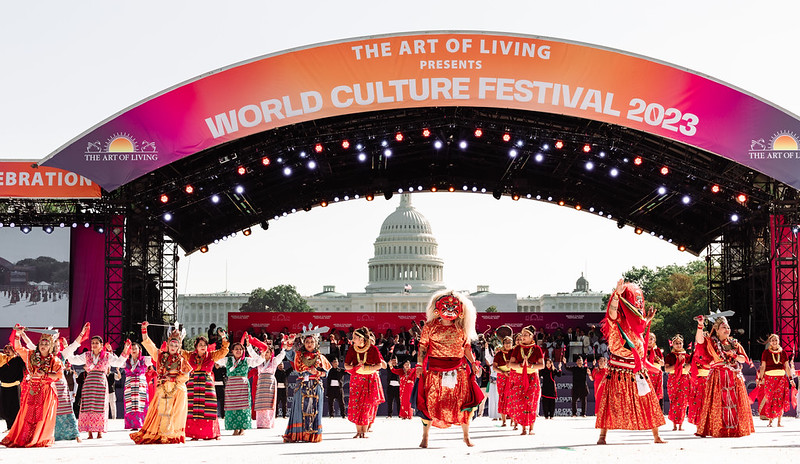

D.C. Mayor Muriel Bowser opened the festival and emphasized the festival’s goals of coming together to celebrate diversity and unity. The event hosted global leaders and performers representing various cultures. Former UN Secretary-General Ban Ki-moon, addressed the assembly, stating that culture facilitates global unity by fostering dialogue and mutual understanding. While noting progress in science and technology, he emphasized that cultural, spiritual, and moral cooperation is necessary for conflict resolution and the achievement of the Sustainable Development Goals. Indian External Affairs Minister S. Jaishankar also delivered a speech, remarking that it was heartwarming to see the panorama of global cultures on display. He noted that the gathering served to express friendship, strengthen solidarity, and promote peace and understanding. He further observed that humanity is a truly diverse group, an identity expressed through its various cultures, traditions, and heritage.Sri Sri Ravi Shankar shared the spiritual objective of the gathering, telling the crowds that the purpose of all sound is to create inner silence, which he described as the source of creativity and the foundation of love and compassion. He expressed a vision for a world defined by celebration, compassion, and togetherness. Other notable figures who attended the 2023 edition include Jaime Aparicio, the former Bolivian Ambassador to the United States, former Slovenian Prime Minister Alojz Peterle, former Tunisian president Moncef Marzouki, former Surgeon General of the United States Vivek Murthy, President of Mauritius Prithvirajsing Roopun, Ryzsard Czarnecki, former President of India Ramnath Kovind, and Tim Draper.

The festival's centerpiece was an array of artistic performances, featuring local art troupes and professional artists showcasing dance, vocal performances, musical instrument recitals, martial arts, and acrobatics. Artistic showcases represented a broad spectrum of global traditions, including Chinese dancers and dragons, an Indian Garba folk dance, and a 50th-anniversary tribute to Hip-Hop featuring Kurtis Blow, SHA-Rock, the Sequence Girls, and DJ Kool. The program also featured Indian classical dance accompanied by a live symphony, a Ukrainian Hopak, and Bulgarian folklore groups. Meanwhile, a group of Swiss alphorn players traveled to perform in their second World Culture Festival, joining other musical highlights such as a guitar ensemble led by Micki Free. The event concluded with Skip Marley, grandson of Bob Marley, who performed "One Love" as a tribute to the festival's message of global unity.

== Local criticism, concern raised by the NGT, and plea to the Supreme Court ==
The festival drew criticism in the Indian news media over its environmental impact on the Yamuna floodplain. The National Green Tribunal (NGT) allowed the event to proceed after the foundation paid a security deposit of ₹5 crore (US$520,000) to cover potential damage. In 2017, the NGT upheld an environmental compensation fee of ₹5 crore against the organizers. The Art of Living Foundation disputed the tribunal's findings, maintained that restoration work had been carried out, and took the matter to the Supreme Court of India. In August 2026, the Supreme Court of India set aside the NGT order, finding no direct evidence linking the event to the alleged damage, and directed the Delhi Development Authority to refund the compensation amount to the organisers.

- Cultural diversity
- Globalism
- World Peace Congress
