= Ravi Shankar (spiritual leader) =

Indian spiritual leader

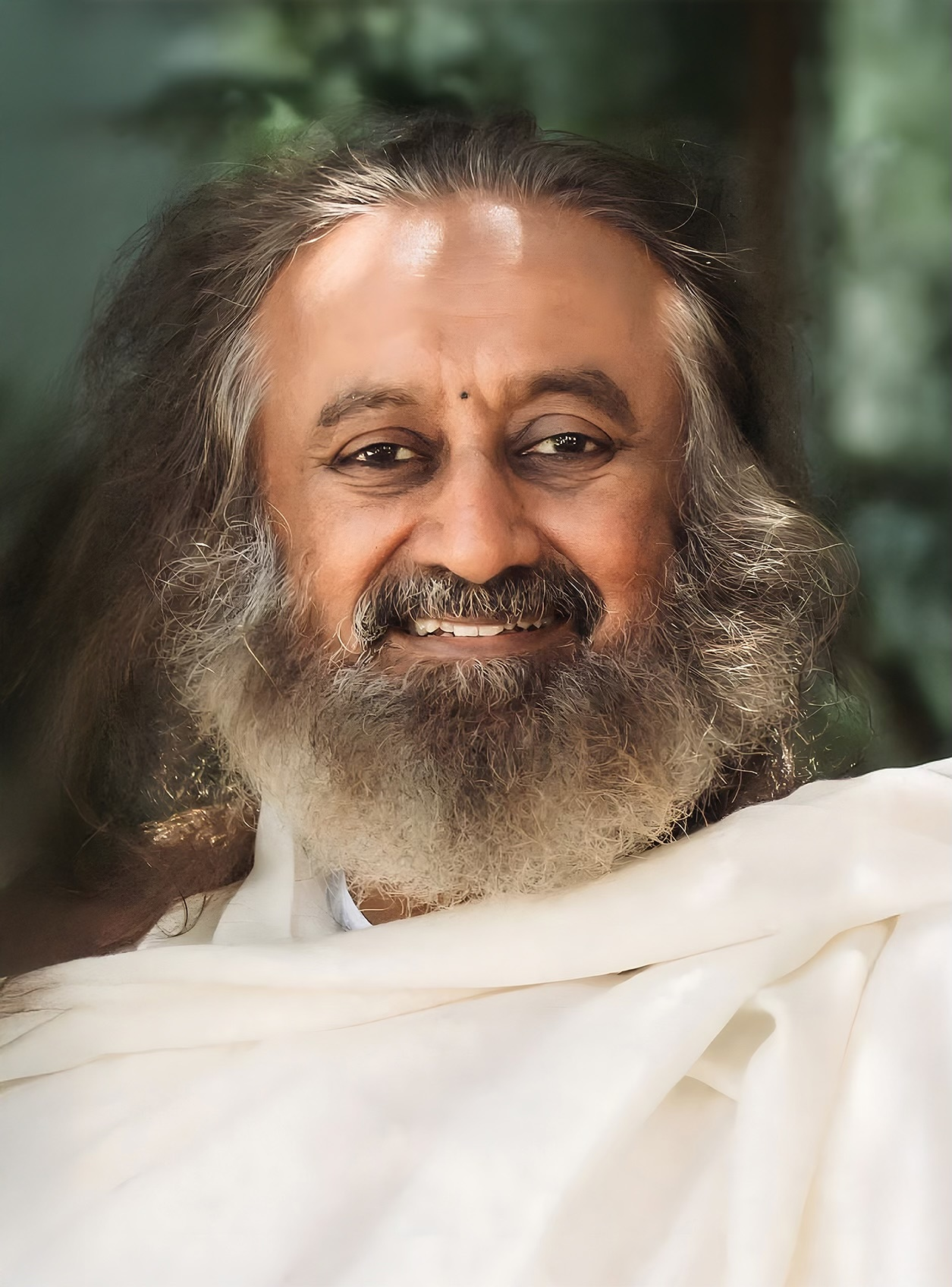
- Born: 13 May 1956 (age 70); Papanasam, Thanjavur district, Madras State (now Tamil Nadu), India
- Education: St. Joseph's College, Bangalore
- Organization: Art of Living Foundation
- Honors: Padma Vibhushan
- Website: Official website

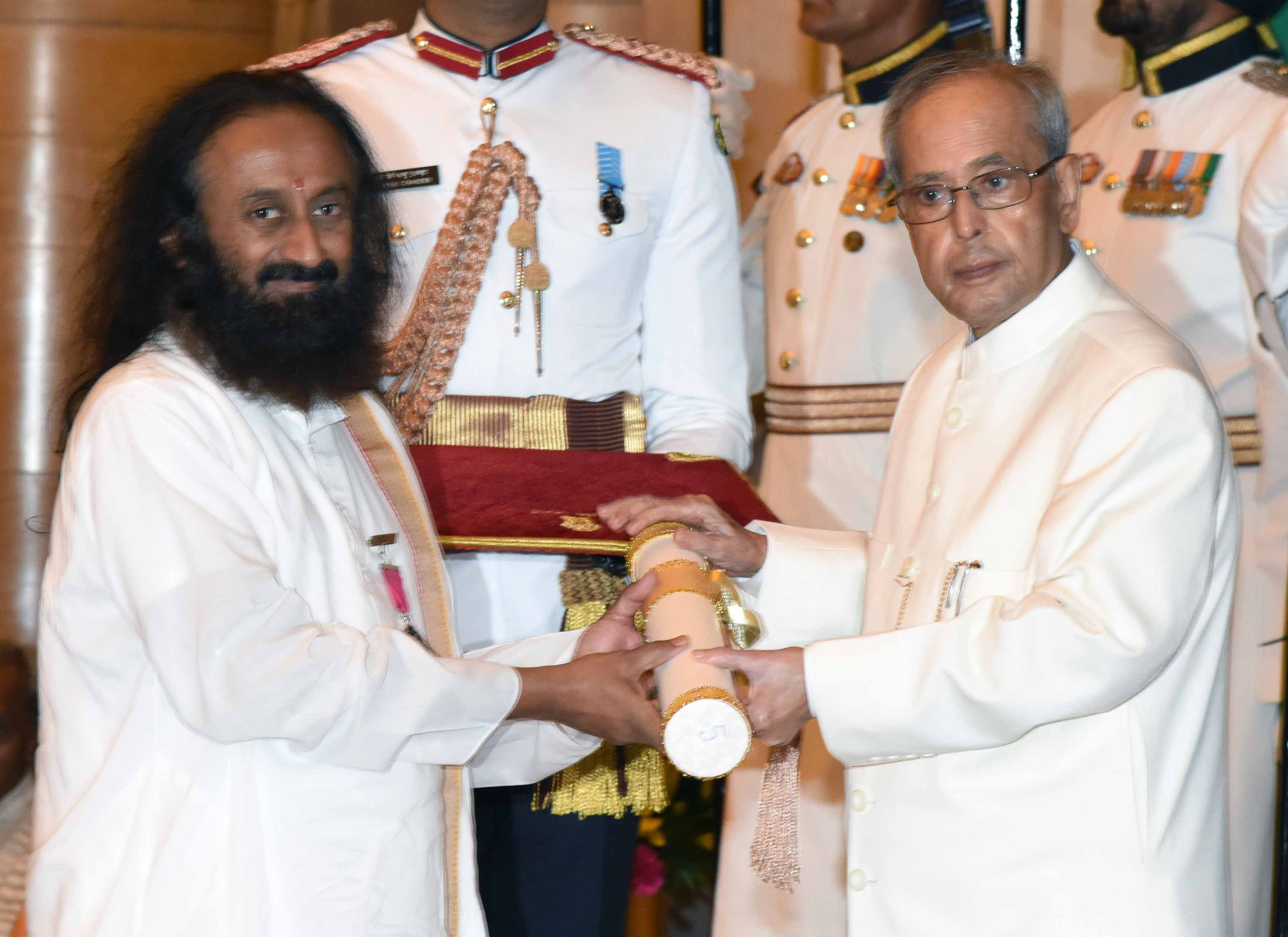
Pranab Mukherjee, presenting the Padma Vibhushan to Shankar at the Rashtrapati Bhavan

Ravi Shankar (born 13 May 1956) is an Indian guru and spiritual leader. He is also referred to by the honorifics Sri Sri and Gurudev. From the mid-1970s, he worked as an apprentice under Maharishi Mahesh Yogi, the founder of Transcendental Meditation, before founding the Art of Living Foundation in 1981.

His work has included programmes related to meditation, yoga, and stress-management practices, and he is associated with the development of Sudarshan Kriya, a breathing technique taught as part of the Art of Living Foundation's activities.

Shankar has also been involved in international peace mediation, including the Colombian peace process and the Ayodhya dispute in India. In 2016, he was awarded the Padma Vibhushan, India's second-highest civilian honour.

== Life ==
Shankar was born on 13 May 1956 in Papanasam, Tamil Nadu, to Vishalakshi and R. S. Venkat Ratnam. He was named "Ravi" (an Indian name which means "sun") because his birth was on a Sunday, and "Shankar" after the eighth-century Hindu saint, Adi Shankara, whose birthday was the same day as Shankar's.

His first teacher was Sudhakar Chaturvedi, an Indian Vedic Scholar and a close associate of Mahatma Gandhi. He completed his graduation in Physics from St. Joseph's College, Bangalore in 1973. After graduation, he travelled with his second teacher, Maharishi Mahesh Yogi, giving talks and arranging conferences on Vedic science, and setting up Transcendental Meditation and Ayurveda centers.

In the 1980s, he initiated a series of practical and experiential courses in spirituality around the globe. He says that his rhythmic breathing practice, Sudarshan Kriya, came to him in 1982, "like a poem, an inspiration", after a ten-day period of silence on the banks of the Bhadra River in Shivamogga, in the state of Karnataka, adding, "I learned it and started teaching it".

In 1983, he held the first Art of Living course in Switzerland. In 1986, he travelled to Apple Valley, California, in the US to conduct the first course to be held in North America.

== Philosophy and teachings ==
=== Spirituality ===
He believes spirituality is that which enhances human values such as love, compassion and enthusiasm. It is not limited to any one religion or culture. Hence it is open to all people. According to him, the spiritual bond we share as part of the human family is more important than nationality, gender, religion, profession, or other identities that separate us.

According to him, science and spirituality are linked and compatible, both springing from the urge to know. The question, "Who am I?" leads to spirituality; the question, "What is this?" leads to science. Emphasizing that joy is only available in the present moment, his stated vision is to create a world free of stress and violence. His programs are said to offer practical tools to help accomplish this. He sees breath as the link between body and mind, and a tool to relax the mind, emphasising the importance of both meditation/spiritual practice and service to others. In his view, "Truth is spherical rather than linear; so it has to be contradictory."

== Art of Living Foundation ==
Shankar founded the Art of Living Foundation in 1981, a volunteer-based non-governmental organization that runs programmes in yoga, meditation, and breath-based practices. The foundation has held consultative status with the United Nations Economic and Social Council since 1996. Its programmes include Sudarshan Kriya, a breathing-based meditation practice that has been the subject of clinical research examining stress and anxiety, with studies reporting mixed results and noting limitations related to study size and duration. The foundation has also been involved in humanitarian initiatives, including disaster relief, and rural development activities.

Shankar addressed a public gathering on peace and leadership at the State Theatre New Jersey in September 2026, organised by the Art of Living Foundation as part of his global humanitarian tours.

He visited to Limassol, Cyprus for three days, from November 3-5, 2026, where he led meditation and wisdom masterclass at Patticheio Municipal Theatre. Moreover, PM Modi visited the Art of Living International Centre in Bengaluru, for celebrations marking Gurudev’s 70th birthday and acknowledging the remarkable work of 45 years of The Art of Living’s humanitarian service.

== Social and humanitarian initiatives ==
Shankar co-founded the International Association for Human Values (IAHV) and the Art of Living Foundation, both of which operate social programs in India and internationally.

=== Education and rural development ===
Through the IAHV's Care for Children program, the Foundation claims to provide educational support in rural India, reporting a presence in over 700 schools as of 2023. For higher education, the organization's YesPlus stress management modules have been implemented at various institutions, including Yale University. Independent academic reviews have noted that while these modules are widely adopted, published evidence regarding their efficacy at the university level relies largely on qualitative data rather than longitudinal quantitative studies.

=== Environmental projects ===
Since 2013, the Foundation has conducted river rejuvenation and groundwater recharge projects in India involving reforestation and the construction of check dams. These initiatives, such as the restoration of the Naganathi and Kumudvathi rivers, have received recognition from the Ministry of Jal Shakti.

=== World Meditation Day ===
Following the unanimous adoption of United Nations General Assembly Resolution A/79/L.27 on 6 December 2024, 21 December was designated as World Meditation Day. On 20 December 2024, Ravi Shankar delivered a keynote address at a commemorative event hosted by the Permanent Mission of India at the United Nations Headquarters in New York. World Meditation Day was first observed on 21 December at the Trusteeship Council chamber at the United Nations Headquarters.

=== Institutional programs and rehabilitation ===
The Prison S.M.A.R.T. program, established in 1992, provides yoga and meditation training within correctional facilities. The program operates in several countries, including India, the United States, and various European nations, focusing on stress reduction and rehabilitation for inmates.

=== World Culture Festival ===
The Art of Living Foundation organizes the World Culture Festival, an international cultural event featuring music, dance, and artistic performances, described by organizers as a platform for intercultural exchange.

In March 2016, the festival was held on the floodplains of the Yamuna River in New Delhi and was inaugurated by Indian Prime Minister Narendra Modi. According to organizers, the event drew an estimated 3.5 million attendees and 37,000 artists. It subsequently became the subject of environmental concerns and proceedings before the National Green Tribunal (NGT) regarding its impact on the floodplain ecosystem.

NGT alleged environmental damage to the Yamuna floodplain from the festival and imposed a ₹5 crore compensation fee, which the foundation paid as a security deposit while disputing the findings. The Art of Living Foundation challenged the order before the Supreme Court of India. In August 2026, the Supreme Court of India set aside the NGT order, finding no direct evidence linking the event to the alleged damage, and directed the Delhi Development Authority to refund the compensation amount to the organisers.

== Peace efforts ==
=== Pakistan ===
He visited Pakistan in 2004 on a goodwill mission and again in 2012 when he inaugurated Art of Living centers in Islamabad and Karachi. The Islamabad center was burned down by armed men in March 2014.

=== Iraq ===
During his visits to Iraq, at the invitation of Prime Minister Nouri al Maliki, in 2007 and again in 2008, he met with political and religious leaders to promote global peace. In November 2014, Shankar visited the relief camps in Erbil, Iraq. He also hosted a conference to address the dire condition of Yazidis and other non-Muslims in the region.

=== Colombia and FARC ===
In June 2015, Shankar met with the delegations of Colombian government and the FARC who were negotiating the resolution to Colombian conflict in Havana. He urged FARC leaders to follow the Gandhian principle of non-violence to attain their political objectives and social justice. For his efforts, Colombia's House of Representatives awarded him the Simón Bolívar Order of Democracy, Knight Cross grade.

=== Venezuela ===
In 2019, Shankar met with Venezuelan leaders from both sides to encourage dialogue, end the political conflict and restore peace and stability in the country.

=== Kashmir ===
The South Asian Forum for Peace was launched in November 2016 at a conference titled "Kashmir Back to Paradise" in Jammu. According to Shankar, 90% of people in Kashmir want peace but are neglected. He added, "The solution to the Kashmir problem can only come from the Kashmiris". This forum is intended to bring together eight South Asian countries to cooperate in areas such as entrepreneurship, skill development, cultural exchange, educational partnerships and women's empowerment.

=== Northeast India ===
68 militants from 11 militant outfits surrendered to the government in Manipur on the eve of India's 71st Independence Day in August 2017. The Chief Minister of Manipur, N. Biren Singh, lauded Shankar for his efforts in making this happen and "bringing peace in troubled areas". Shankar organization has been working in Manipur for the last 15 years.

In September 2017, at the "Strength in Diversity – North East Indigenous People's Conference", Shankar claimed that another 500 militants were waiting to "lay down weapons and join the peace process". The conference was attended by representatives from 67 rebel outfits from the Northeast. Expressing his willingness to facilitate the peaceful transition of any rebel group wanting to join the mainstream, Shankar claimed that his organization has been working for this for the last 10–12 years and "will continue to work until the last gun is laid down". Former ULFA General Secretary, Anup Chetia, who was also the convenor of the conference, appreciated Shankar's interest and efforts for peace in the region.

=== Ayodhya Ram Mandir dispute ===
Shankar's efforts at mediation in the Ayodhya dispute in 2017 received a mixed response from both Hindu and Muslim leaders. Based on Supreme Court of India's suggestion for an out-of-court settlement, he proposed a mutual compromise where both communities "gift" neighbouring pieces of land to each other. This proposal was met with a lot of skepticism and resistance.

In March 2019, he was appointed by the Supreme Court of India to a 3-member mediation committee tasked with finding a resolution for the case in 8 weeks. In its final verdict, the Supreme Court of India assigned the disputed land to a trust for building a temple and an alternate piece of land nearby to build a mosque.

=== Interfaith dialogue ===
Shankar is involved in interfaith dialogue and currently sits on the Board of World Religious Leaders for the Elijah Interfaith Institute. Through interfaith summits in 2008 and 2010, he has been engaging faith-based leaders for collective action against HIV. In July 2013 at a meeting in UNAIDS headquarters in Geneva, issues including HIV prevention, gender based violence, stigma and discrimination were discussed.

== United Nations ==
In April 2022, Ravi Shankar addressed a seminar at the United Nations Office at Geneva titled "Unity and Collaboration in a Post-Pandemic World," organised jointly by the International Association for Human Values and the Permanent Mission of India. He identified communication breakdown and lack of trust as primary structural drivers of conflict, and launched an "I Stand for Peace" campaign at the close of the event.

In September 2023, he delivered a keynote address at a "Discourse on Peace" event at the United Nations Headquarters in New York, organised by the Permanent Mission of India to mark the International Day of Peace.

In December 2024, following the adoption of United Nations General Assembly Resolution A/RES/79/137, which designated 21 December as World Meditation Day, Ravi Shankar delivered the keynote address at the inaugural commemorative event at the United Nations Trusteeship Council chamber in New York, where he led a guided meditation.

In December 2025, he delivered the keynote address at the second annual World Meditation Day observance at the United Nations headquarters in New York, in a session titled "Healing the World from Within" organised by the Permanent Mission of India.

== Awards and recognition ==
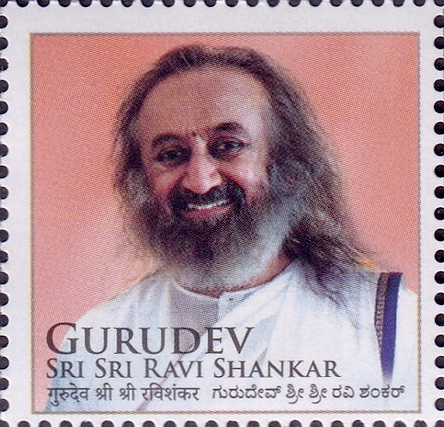
Ravi Shankar on a 2026 stamp of India

=== State honors and civilian awards ===
| Year | Award / Honor | Issuing Authority / Country |
|---|---|---|
| 2025 | World Leader for Peace and Security Award | Boston Global Forum & AIWS |
| 2023 | Honorary Officer of the Order of Fiji | Government of Fiji |
| 2023 | National Water Awards | Government of India |
| 2022 | Grand Cordon – Honorary Order of the Yellow Star | Government of Suriname |
| 2016 | Padma Vibhushan | Government of India |
| 2016 | Dr. Nagendra Singh International Peace Award | India |
| 2015 | Medalla de la Integración (Grand Officer) | Andean Parliament, Peru |
| 2013 | Gandhi, King, Ikeda Community Builders Prize | Morehouse College, USA |
| 2012 | Order of National Merit of Comuneros | Government of Paraguay |
| 2012 | Illustrious Citizen / Illustrious Guest | Asunción & Paraguayan Municipality |
| 2012 | Sivananda World Peace Award | Sivananda Foundation, South Africa |
| 2011 | Crans Montana Forum Award | Brussels, Belgium |
| 2009 | Fifth Most Powerful Leader in India | Forbes Magazine |
| 2007 | Sant Shri Dnyaneshwara World Peace Prize | Pune, India |
| 2006 | Order of the Polar Star | Government of Mongolia |
| 2005 | Bharat Shiromani Award | New Delhi, India |
| 2004 | Order of Democracy Simón Bolívar | Government of Colombia |

=== Honorary doctorates ===
| Year | Institution | Country |
|---|---|---|
| 2024 | Teerthanker Mahaveer University | India |
| 2022 | University of Buenos Aires | Argentina |
| 2022 | Siglo XXI University | Argentina |
| 2012 | National University of Asunción | Paraguay |
| 2012 | Nyenrode Business University | Netherlands |
| 2007 | Maharaja Sayajirao University of Baroda | India |
| 2007 | Suresh Gyan Vihar University | India |
| 2004 | Kuvempu University | India |

=== Proclamations ===
- 2025: October 19th was proclaimed Gurudev Sri Sri Ravi Shankar Day by the City of Seattle.
- 2008: Proclamation of Commendation by the State of New Jersey, USA.
- 2008: Honorary Citizenship and Goodwill Ambassador, Houston, USA.

== Reception ==
In 2012, Shankar, while attending a function in Jaipur, claimed that some Indian government schools are breeding grounds for Naxalism, a movement of militant communist groups in India declared to be terrorist organisations. "All government schools and colleges should be privatised. The government should not run any school. It's often found that children from government schools get into Naxalism and violence. Children from private schools don't get into this," he was quoted as saying by media reports, his comments were condemned by educationists and ministers as "unfortunate, illogical", and termed it as a "bizarre logic for privatisation" Later, he issued a clarification that he didn't mean that all government schools breed Naxalism. More clarification followed on his Twitter account: "I specifically referred to sick government schools in Naxal affected areas. Many who have turned to Naxalism have come from these schools. I did not say all Govt schools (where lakhs study) breed Naxalism. Great talents have emerged from these schools & I would never generalize."

In March 2018, he faced criticism from political leaders for his commentary, where he said, India will turn into Syria if the Ram temple issue is not resolved soon.

Writing in the Financial Times in 2022, the newspaper's Mumbai correspondent Chloe Cornish reported that a small number of peer-reviewed studies had found Shankar's breathing techniques effective as part of treatment for depression, while one scientific paper described the central breathing technique of Sudarshan Kriya as "rhythmic hyperventilation". She also reported that hundreds of students at the Indian Institute of Science had protested against a talk Shankar gave there, out of concern that it lent endorsement to views they considered unscientific.

From the early 2000s, anonymous critics published online posts accusing the Art of Living Foundation of misappropriating funds, using aggressive sales tactics, brainwashing followers, operating as a cult and causing psychological harm. The foundation denied the allegations and later sued two of the bloggers in a United States court for libel and publication of trade secrets. The case was settled, with the foundation paying both sides' legal costs, and was dismissed with prejudice, so that the defendants could not be tried again. The bloggers' material remained online, although a judge in Bangalore ordered at least one of the blogs to be blocked.

== Bibliography ==
- An Intimate Note to the Sincere Seeker; Vol. 1: ISBN 1-885289-29-4, Vol. 2: ISBN 1-885289-30-8, Vol. 3: ISBN 1-885289-33-2, Vol. 4: ISBN 1-885289-36-7, Vol. 5: ISBN 1-885289-38-3, Vol. 6: ISBN 1-885289-40-5, Vol. 7: ISBN 1-885289-41-3
- Buddha: manifestation of silence, ISBN 81-89291-91-2
- 1999 – Be A Witness: The Wisdom of the Upanishads, 106 pp. ISBN 81-7621-063-3
- 2000 – God Loves Fun, 138 pp. ISBN 1-885289-05-7
- 2001 – Celebrating Silence: Excerpts from Five Years of Weekly Knowledge 1995–2000, 206 pp. ISBN 1-885289-39-1
- Celebrating Love ISBN 1-885289-42-1
- 2005 – Narada Bhakti Sutra, 129 pp. ISBN 81-7811-029-6
- Hinduism & Islam, the common thread, 34 pp, 2002
- Secrets of Relationships, Arktos, 2014
- Patanjali Yoga Sutras, Arktos, 2014
- Ashtavakra Gita, 2010, ISBN 9380592833
- Management Mantras, Arktos, 2014
- Know Your Child: The Art of Raising Children, Arktos, 2014
- Notes for the Journey Within: Essentials of the Art of Living. ISBN 979-8886450675
- Gautier, François (2008). The Guru of Joy: Sri Sri Ravi Shankar & the art of living (Revised & updated ed.). New York: Hay House. ISBN 978-8-19056-559-2. (First edition: India, Books Today, 2002. ISBN 81-87478-42-X)
- Fischman, Michael (2010). Stumbling into Infinity: An Ordinary Man in the Sphere of Enlightenment. Morgan James Publishing. ISBN 978-1-60037-648-1.
- Lebelley, Frederique (March 2010). Walking the Path : Narrative of an experience with H.H. Sri Sri Ravi Shankar. Bangalore: Sri Sri Publications Trust. ISBN 978-9-07784-076-4.

== See also ==
- List of peace activists
