= Art of Living Foundation =

Indian non-governmental organisation

Coordinates: 12.825845°N 77.508759°E

The Art of Living Foundation
- Founder: Sri Sri Ravi Shankar
- Headquarters: 21st Km, Udaypura, Kanakapura Road, Bengaluru
- Website: www.artofliving.org

The Art of Living Foundation is a volunteer-based, non profit, humanitarian and educational non-governmental organisation (NGO). It was founded in 1981 by Ravi Shankar in Bengaluru, India, which also serves as the location of its international centre. The Art of Living Foundation has centres in 180 countries.

== Organisation ==
The Art of Living Foundation has been an educational and humanitarian organisation in the U.S. since 1989.

The majority of the officers of the organisation, along with most of its teachers and staff, are volunteers. Many of its programs are conducted through or in conjunction with a partner organisation, the International Association for Human Values (IAHV). Its programs draw on Advaita Vedanta tradition and practices. The Foundation operates as a charitable or non-profit organisation with chapters in many parts of the world.

== Courses and programmes ==
Its stress-elimination and self-development programs are based on the breathing technique Sudarshan Kriya, Meditation and yoga. This technique is a major part of Art of Living courses. These courses have been conducted for students and faculty, government officials, firemen, ex-militants, and prisoners.

== Social service ==
Its areas of work cover disaster relief, poverty alleviation, prisoner rehabilitation, empowerment of women, campaigns against female feticide, and environmental sustainability.

=== Project Vidarbha ===
In 2007, with the support of the state government, volunteers from the foundation provided training to farmers in six Vidarbha districts in organic and zero-budget farming, rainwater harvesting, and multiple cropping, as well as teaching them the Art of Living course. The next year, the foundation said it had to reduce the scale of its work after the state government announced loan waiver for farmers and pulled back funding for the foundation's project

In 2008, Ravi Shankar announced the extension of the program to Andhra Pradesh to end farmer suicides from financial stress in that state.

=== Mission Green Earth ===
In 2008, the foundation launched 'Mission Green Earth Stand Up Take Action' campaign to plant 100 million trees to help reduce global warming and protect the environment, in partnership with United Nations Millennium Campaign and United Nations Environment Programme.

=== River Rejuvenation Projects ===
In February 2013, the foundation launched a three-year program to rejuvenate the Kumudavathi River (in Bangalore) under its 'Volunteer for Better India' campaign along with civic authorities and environmentalists to address water shortage problems. Ravi Shankar led a walkathon in Bangalore to create awareness about the program. The project had revived five water-recharge wells, constructed 74 boulder checks, cleaned up 18 step wells and planted 2,350 saplings in seven villages by June 2014.

Similar efforts were held to revive Pallar River in Andhra Pradesh, Manjra river in Maharashtra, and Vedavathi River in Karnataka.

=== Volunteer For a Better India ===
The Art of Living, along with UN agencies, NGOs and civil society, launched Volunteer For a Better India (VFABI) on 5 December 2012.

VFABI protested against the 2012 Delhi gang-rape case. In May 2013, 1,634 volunteers distributed medicines worth Rs. 2.2 million under the guidance of 262 doctors to over 20,000 slum dwellers in Delhi through 108 free health camps organised in collaboration with the Indian Medical Association.

In September 2013, the 'I vote for better India' initiative was launched to increase awareness of the importance of voting as a responsibility towards the nation.

== Controversies ==
=== Settlement with anonymous bloggers ===
In 2010, Art of Living sued two anonymous bloggers for defamation, trade libel, copyright infringement and disclosing trade secrets. The two claimed to be former teachers/followers of Art of Living and had written posts critical of the foundation. The Foundation's request to unmask the bloggers' identities was denied, and the judge allowed only the trade secrets claim to go to trial.

In a 2012 settlement, the bloggers agreed to freeze their existing blogs with no restriction on starting up new blogs critical of Art of Living.

=== Land encroachment ===
In 2011, a public-interest litigation petition filed in the Karnataka High Court alleged that Art of Living had constructed structures on the Udipalya tank. The government of Karnataka found on inspection that the foundation had encroached upon 6.53 hectares (16.1 acres) of the tank area and issued a show cause notice.

=== World Culture Festival on Yamuna flood plains ===
Art of Living Foundation organised the World Culture Festival on the Yamuna Flood plains in March 2016. A committee appointed by the National Green Tribunal recommended a fine of Rs 1,200 million on Art of Living Foundation for damaging the ecology of the flood plains. The fine was later reduced to Rs 50 million, with no further events to be allowed at that location. After initially disputing the fine, with Ravi Shankar declaring that he would rather go to prison, the foundation paid on 3 June 2016. The Supreme Court overturned the order of the NGT, citing no wrong doing by Art of Living and ordered to refund deposit of Rs 50 million.

=== Burning of the Islamabad center in Pakistan ===
After the organisation's yoga center in Islamabad, Pakistan was burned down by armed men in March 2014, the Foundation reported receiving threats from the Taliban. The center has since been rebuilt and is functioning.
