= October 1925 =

Month in 1925

<<	October 1925					>>
Su	Mo	Tu	We	Th	Fr	Sa
				1	2	3
4	5	6	7	8	9	10
11	12	13	14	15	16	17
18	19	20	21	22	23	24
25	26	27	28	29	30	31

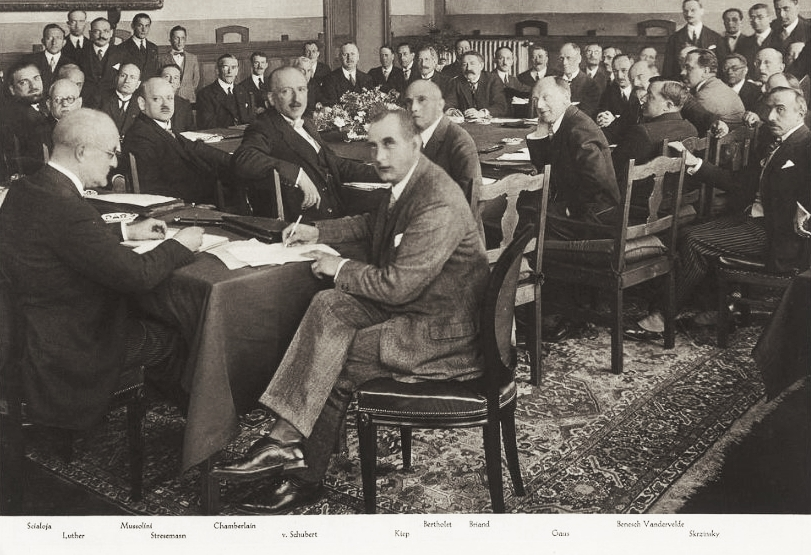
October 11, 1925: Locarno conference in Switzerland ends with partial settlement of German grievances against France.

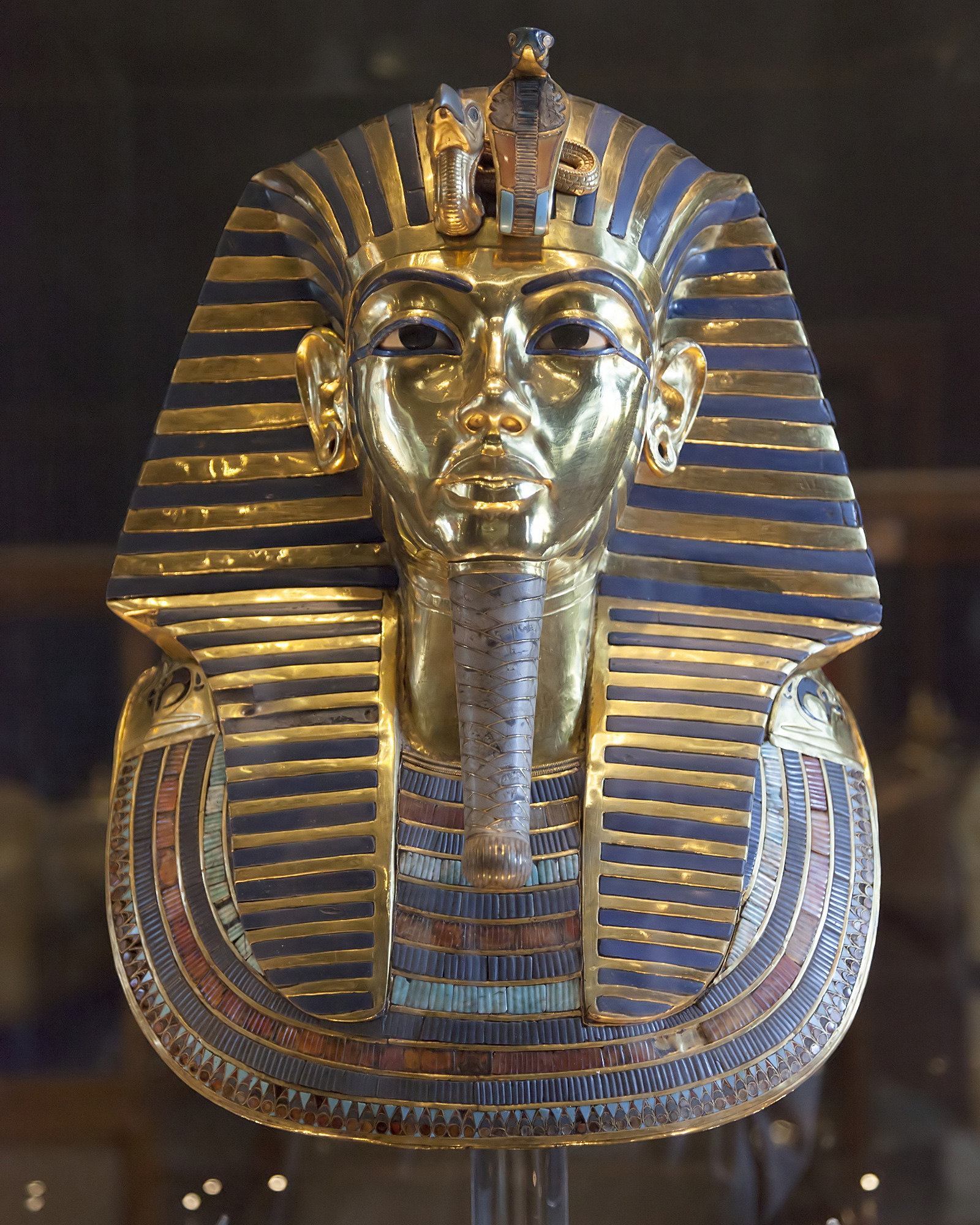
October 28, 1925: King Tut's mummy and gold mask are discovered in Egypt.

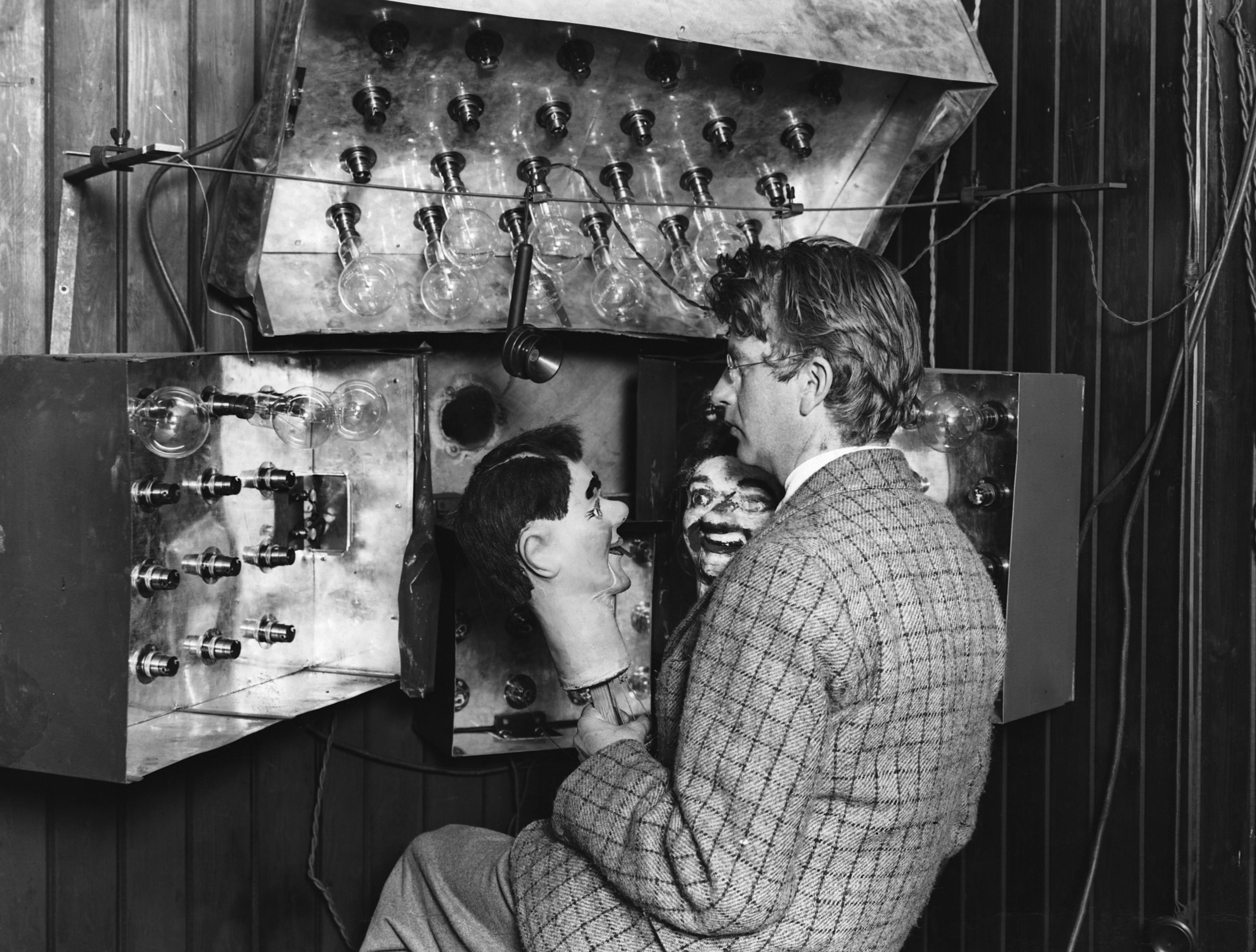
October 2, 1925:John Logie Baird transmits the first television image

The following events occurred in October 1925:

== October 1, 1925 (Thursday) ==
- Chile's President Arturo Alessandri resigned, and Vice President Luis Barros Borgoño took over as the acting president.
- Thousands of people in the Mexican state of Guanajuato were left homeless after the Lerma River flooded.
- In Lubbock, Texas, Texas Technological College, later to be renamed Texas Tech University, opened for its first classes with 914 students.
- The Kraków University of Economics opened in Poland as Wyższe Studium Handlowe ("The College of Commerce") in the city of Kraków.
- Born:
  - Christine Pullein-Thompson and Diana Pullein-Thompson, British horsewomen and writers known for their pony books; in London, England (Christine, d. 2005; Diana, d. 2015)
  - Yang Hyong-sop, North Korean politician, served as the Chairman of the Supreme People's Assembly of North Korea from 1983 to 1998; in Hamhung, Kankyōnan Province, Japanese Korea (present-day North Korea) (d. 2022)

== October 2, 1925 (Friday) ==
- The first television transmission was made by Scottish inventor John Logie Baird at his laboratory at 22 Frith Street in London. Baird's camera captured the 32-line vertically greyscale scanned image of the head of a ventriloquist's dummy, which he had nicknamed "Stooky Bill". An office worker in the same building, 20-year-old William Edward Taynton, appeared before Baird's camera the same day and became the first person to have his image on television.
- Spanish troops entered the Rif Republic capital of Ajdir.
- The first branch of the Islamic Ahmadiyya sect in what is now Indonesia was established in the Dutch East Indies by Rahmat Ali, an Ahmadiyya missionary, along with 13 adherents in the town of Tapaktuan.
- The Pact of the Vidoni Palace was signed at the Palazzo Vidoni-Caffarelli in Rome between the Fascist-dominated General Confederation of Italian Industry (Confederazione Generale dell'Industria Italiana or CGI) and the Fascist-controlled National Confederation of Trade Union Corporations labor union.
- La Revue nègre, an all-Black cabaret production starring African-American dancer and actress Josephine Baker, premiered in Paris at the Théâtre des Champs-Élysées in Paris and made Baker popular worldwide. After two months in Paris, Baker and the troupe of dancers went on tour to Brussels and Berlin.
- In Richmond, Virginia, three workers of a 40-member crew were killed when they were buried alive by the collapse of the Church Hill Tunnel. The tragedy gave rise to an urban legend more than 80 years later, the "Richmond Vampire".
- Born:
  - Paul Goldsmith American race car driver, winner of the U.S. Auto Club Stock Car championship in 1961 and 1962; in Parkersburg, West Virginia, United States (d. 2024)
  - Sadao Kondoh, Japanese professional baseball pitcher and manager, inductee of the Japanese Baseball Hall of Fame; in Okazaki, Aichi, Empire of Japan (present-day Japan) (d. 2006)
  - Anne Ranasinghe, German-born Sri Lankan poet; as Anneliese Katz, in Essen, Germany (d. 2016)

== October 3, 1925 (Saturday) ==
- The first conference of Western Hemisphere nations to discuss the building of a Pan-American Highway opened at Buenos Aires in Argentina.
- The American aircraft carrier USS Lexington was launched.
- Only two days after the inauguration of the first classes of Texas Technological College, the college's first sports event was played as the Texas Tech Matadors and the McMurry College Indians played to a 0 to 0 tie before about 8,000 spectators at the South Plains Fairgrounds in Lubbock, Texas.
- Born:
  - Gore Vidal, American novelist known for the Narratives of Empire series and Myra Breckinridge; as Eugene Louis Vidal, in West Point, New York, United States (d. 2012)
  - George Wein, American jazz pianist and promoter who founded the Newport Jazz Festival in 1954; in Lynn, Massachusetts, United States (d. 2021)
- Died: C. Web Gilbert, 58, Australian sculptor; died of cardiovascular disease (b. 1867)

== October 4, 1925 (Sunday) ==
- All 53 crew of the Finland Navy's torpedo boat S2 were killed when the vessel sank during a fierce storm near the coast of Pori in the Gulf of Bothnia.
- After 11 years of limited prohibition of alcohol, the Soviet Union removed all restrictions on the alcohol content of beverages.
- The Hama uprising broke out in Syria as rebel assault led by Fawzi al-Qawuqji against French mandate security installations in the city of Hama. Heavy French bombardment of Hama led to negotiations between a delegation of Hama's leading families and the French authorities, and the rebels withdrew the next day.
- Baseball legend Ty Cobb, known for his abilities as a hitter and a center fielder, appeared as a pitcher for the Detroit Tigers against St. Louis Browns first baseman George Sisler in a rare game where both teams allowed pitching to be handled by non-pitchers. Cobb pitched one inning and Sisler two as the Tigers beat the Browns, 11 to 6. The appearance of non-pitchers on the mound for both teams would not occur again until almost 92 years later, with a game on May 7, 2017, in the Baltimore Orioles' 9 to 6 win over the Boston Red Sox.
- Born:
  - Richard Moore, American cinematographer and co-founder of Panavision; in Jacksonville, Illinois, United States (d. 2009)
  - Rabbi Alexander M. Schindler, German-born leader in Reform Judaism, served as president of the Union of American Hebrew Congregations; in Munich, Germany (d. 2000)
- Died: Gevorg Bashinjaghian, 68, Armenian landscape painter (b. 1857)

== October 5, 1925 (Monday) ==
- The Locarno Conference began in Locarno in Switzerland between several of the European adversaries of World War One to negotiate Germany's entry into the League of Nations.
- Born:
  - Paul Wild, Swiss astronomer known for his discovery of the 81P/Wild periodic comet later explored by NASA's Stardust mission and six other comets, 94 asteroids, and 41 supernovas; in Wädenswil, Switzerland (d. 2014)
  - Antoine Gizenga, Congolese politician, served as the Prime Minister of the Democratic Republic of the Congo from 1960 to 1961 and 2006 to 2008; in Mbanze, Belgian Congo (present-day Kwilu Province, Democratic Republic of the Congo) (d. 2019)
  - Herbert Kretzmer, South African-born English lyricist known for his English-language adaptation of the musical Les Misérables in 1985; in Kroonstad, Union of South Africa (present-day South Africa) (d. 2020)
  - Gail Davis, American actress and singer, best known for her role as Annie Oakley in the 1950s TV series Annie Oakley; as Betty Jeanne Grayson, in Little Rock, Arkansas, United States (d. 2005)
  - Raisa Struchkova, Soviet ballet dancer; in Moscow, Russian SFSR, Soviet Union (present-day Russia) (d. 2005)
  - Besedka Johnson, American actress who became a film star at the age of 85 in her first and only film, Starlet (2012); as Beatrice Devic, in Detroit, United States (d. 2013)
  - Emiliano Aguirre, Spanish paleontologist; in Ferrol, Spain (d. 2021)

== October 6, 1925 (Tuesday) ==
- A breakthrough in the reproduction of recorded music, the Victor Orthophonic Victrola, was demonstrated to the public for the first time, allowing others to hear the first phonograph specifically designed to play electrically recorded phonograph records.
- The Locarno Conference debated the matter of France wanting assurance of the right to cross through Germany to help Poland and Czechoslovakia in the event of war.
- Born:
  - Manuel Ochoa, Cuban musician and orchestra conductor who co-founded the Miami Symphony Orchestra; in Holguín, Cuba (d. 2006)
  - Shana Alexander, American journalist who was the first woman staff writer and columnist for Life magazine, and was well known for the liberal arguments in the "Point-Counterpoint" segment of 60 Minutes; as Shana Ager, in New York City, United States (d. 2005)
- Died: Israel Abrahams, 66, British Jewish scholar (b. 1858)

== October 7, 1925 (Wednesday) ==
- Germany and France reached a deadlock in Locarno over the Poland and Czechoslovakia matter.
- Born:
  - Mildred Earp, American professional baseball pitcher for the Grand Rapids Chicks in the All-American Girls Professional Baseball League, ERA leader in 1947 with a mark of 0.68; in West Fork, Arkansas, United States (d. 2017)
  - Alex Duthart, Scottish drummer; in Cambusnethan, Scotland (d. 1986)
- Died: Christy Mathewson, 45, American professional baseball pitcher known for a record 373 wins over 17 seasons and being the National League's ERA leader for five seasons (1905, 1908–09, 1911 and 1913) and 5-time National League strikeout leader; died of tuberculosis that developed six years after exposure to chemical weapons during World War I (b. 1880)

== October 8, 1925 (Thursday) ==
- At the Baker Bowl in Philadelphia, the Hilldale Club, a Philadelphia team and pennant winner of the Eastern Colored League won the second annual Colored World Series, defeating the Kansas City Monarchs of the Negro National League 2 to 1, winning the best 4-of-7 series, four games to one. The sixth and seventh scheduled games were played on October 10 and 11 for additional revenue.
- The city of Belgrade in Serbia was awarded the Czechoslovak War Cross 1918.
- Born: Andrei Sinyavsky, Soviet Russian literary critic for Novy Mir magazine and later dissident and co-defendant with Yuri Daniel in the Sinyavsky–Daniel trial of 1966; in Moscow, Russian SFSR, Soviet Union (present-day Russia) (d. 1997)
- Died: Vincenzo Peruggia, 44, Italian art thief known for having stolen the Mona Lisa from the Louvre museum on August 21, 1911, and having kept it until his arrest in 1913; died of a heart attack on his birthday (b. 1881)

== October 9, 1925 (Friday) ==
- The Italian state prosecutor absolved 24 officials of any responsibility for the June 1924 murder of Giacomo Matteotti, ruling that they might have ordered the "sequestration" of Matteotti but not his death, and they would not have had any knowledge of the crime.
- Lithuania held the first day of a three-day mourning period for the loss of Vilnius to Poland in 1920. Many demonstrations were staged in which speakers declared that Lithuania would not have any relations with Poland until Vilnius was returned.
- Born:
  - Richard Jenkin, Cornish politician and co-founder of the Cornish Nationalist political party Mebyon Kernow; in Ilkeston, Derbyshire, England (d. 2002)
  - David Macmillan, Scottish historian known for stealing thousands of historical documents over a 30-year period between 1949 and 1981; in Airdrie, North Lanarkshire, Scotland (d. 1987)
  - John Crosthwaite, English race car designer; in Thornaby-on-Tees, North Yorkshire, England (d. 2010)
- Died:
  - George Obrenović, 35, Son of King Milan I of Serbia and pretender to the throne of Serbia after the 1903 assassination of his half-brother, King Alexander I (b. 1890)
  - Hugo Preuss, 64, German lawyer and politician who had authored the 1919 Weimar Constitution of the first Republic of Germany (b. 1860)

== October 10, 1925 (Saturday) ==
- The Palace Museum was opened to the public in Beijing by the Republic of China on "Double Ten Day" at the site of the former Forbidden City, the Qing dynasty Imperial Palace complex that had been formerly off limits to everyone except the royal family and their staff. According to an audit taken at the time, 1,170,000 pieces of artwork were housed at the Museum when it was first opened. After the Japanese occupation of Beijing in 1937, most of the artifacts would be moved to Nanjing, and during the Communist Revolution of 1949, many of the artifacts would be moved by the Nationalist government to Taiwan and housed in the National Palace Museum in Taipei.
- The championship of Australian rules football, the Grand Final of the Victorian Football League, was played before 64,288 spectators at the Melbourne Cricket Ground. The Geelong Cats won their first VFL title, defeating the Collingwood Magpies, 79 to 69 (10.19 to 9.15).
- About 15 people were killed in Catanzaro, Italy, when a train plunged over a bridge after high floodwaters weakened the bridge's supports.
- Police in Panama killed two people when they opened fire on an open-air labor union meeting discussing what to do about national rent increases.
- The American Federation of Labor called for a nationwide boycott of non-union products to eliminate child labour and obtain better working conditions.
- Born:
  - Robert F. Landel, American chemist known for developing the Williams–Landel–Ferry equation; in Pendleton, New York, United States (d. 2024)
  - Shokichi Natsui, Japanese judoka who won the first World Judo Championships in 1956; in Oga City, Akita Prefecture, Empire of Japan (present-day Japan) (d. 2006)
  - Margaret Pargeter, British romance novelist and author of 49 novels during her lifetime; as Margaret Appleby, in Longhorsley, England (d. 2023)
- Died: James Buchanan Duke, 68, American businessman who modernized cigarette manufacturing and markenting and founded the American Tobacco Company in 1890, later a philanthropist who funded Duke University; died of pneumonia (b. 1856)

== October 11, 1925 (Sunday) ==
- The China Zhi Gong Party, now one of eight minor political parties permitted by the Chinese Communist Party to exist in the People's Republic of China, was founded in the United States in San Francisco by a pair of exiled former warlords who opposed the Kuomintang government of the Republic of China, Chen Jiongming and Tang Jiyao.
- In the U.S., the first FBI agent to be killed in the line of duty, Edwin C. Shanahan, was fatally shot after following a suspected car thief, Martin James Durkin, to a garage in Chicago. For the next three months, the FBI conducted a nationwide manhunt for Durkin, who would be captured in St. Louis on January 20.
- The New York Giants, an expansion franchise of the National Football League, played their first NFL game, losing 14 to 0 to the Providence Steam Rollers before 8,000 people at the Cycledrome in Rhode Island.
- The Washington Senators defeated the Pittsburgh Pirates, 6 to 3, in Game 4 of baseball's World Series to take a 3 games to 1 lead and being within one game of the world championship.
- Powers at Locarno agreed on an arrangement in which, with regard to military obligations in the League of Nations, due consideration would be given to Germany's special military status until such time as a general arms reduction plan could be implemented across Europe. This was thought to remove the main obstacle to Germany's entry into the League of Nations.
- Born: Elmore Leonard, American novelist and screenwriter; in New Orleans, United States (d. 2013)

== October 12, 1925 (Monday) ==
- A contingent of 600 U.S. troops entered Panama at the request of President Rodolfo Chiari to put down a massive renter's strike.
- U.S. athlete Albert Michelsen set a new world's record for long-distance running as he completed the first Port Chester Marathon in 2 hours, 29 minutes and one second in Port Chester, New York. Michelsen's mark broke the record of Finland's Hannes Kolehmainen whose time of 2:32:35.8 had been set five years earlier at the 1920 Summer Olympics in Antwerp.
- Germany and the Soviet Union signed a commercial treaty designed to increase mutual trade.
- Two people were killed and 70 arrested in Paris (including Communist member of parliament Jacques Doriot) during protests against France's involvement in the Rif War in Morocco.
- Born:
  - Martin Gutzwiller, Swiss-American physicist; in Basel, Switzerland (d. 2014)
  - Essie Mae Washington-Williams, American teacher and author who was the eldest daughter of white supremacist and segregationist U.S. Senator Strom Thurmond following his affair with an African American domestic servant; as Essie Mae Butler, in Edgefield, South Carolina, United States (d. 2014)

== October 13, 1925 (Tuesday) ==
- The British seaman's outlaw strike ended. The strike continued in Australia.
- John W. Weeks resigned as United States Secretary of War due to failing health.
- The jewels stolen from Mrs. Jessie Woolworth Donahue on September 30 were returned by a private detective agency. No public statement was given regarding the circumstances of their recovery.

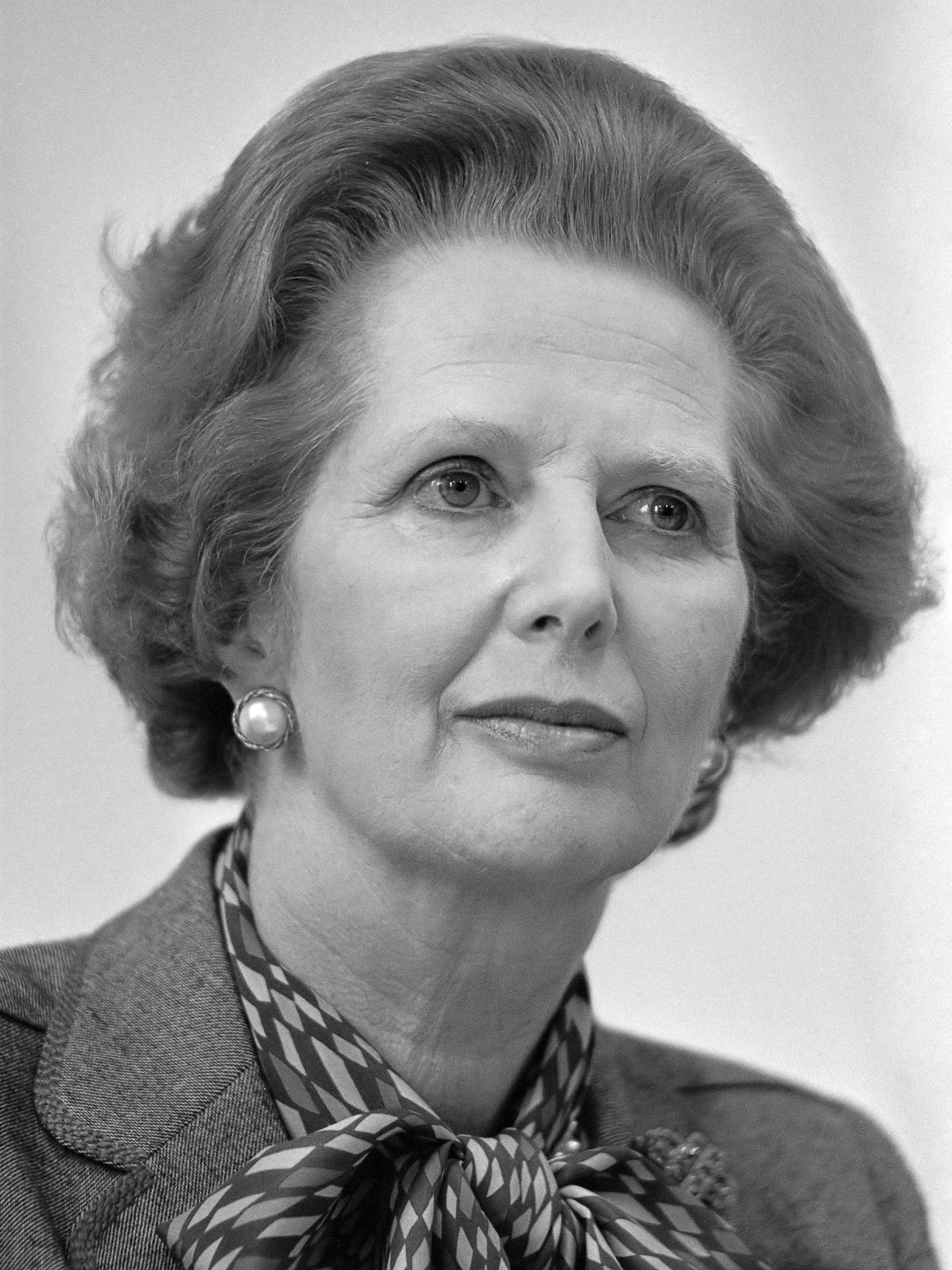
Prime Minister Thatcher

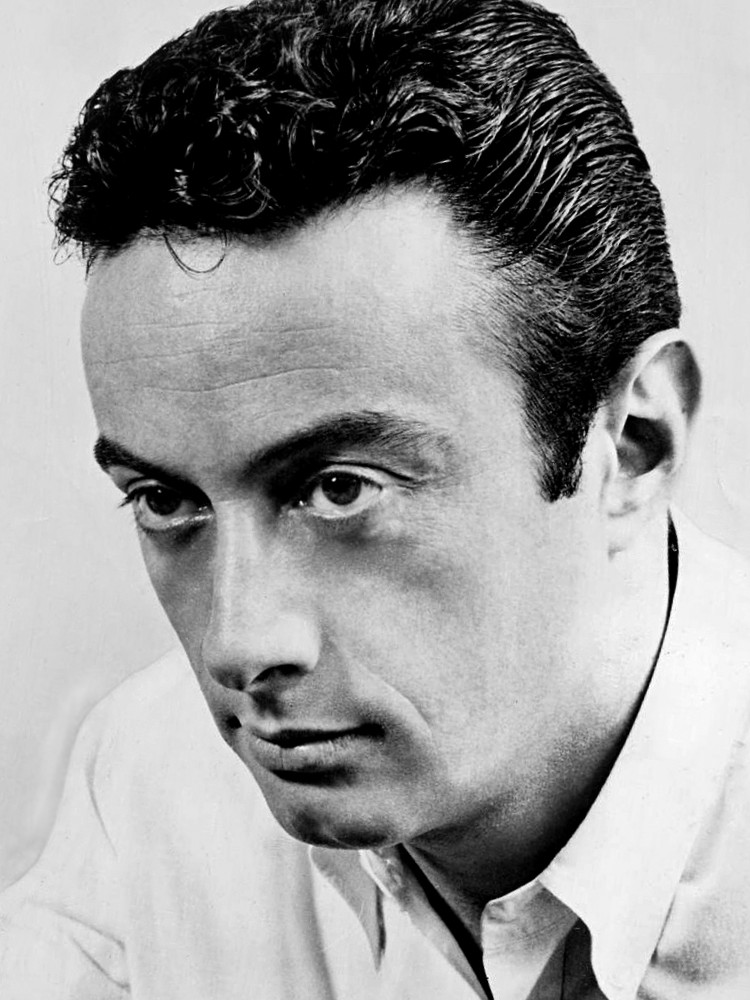
Comedian Lenny Bruce

- Born:
  - Margaret Thatcher, British stateswoman, served as the Prime Minister of the United Kingdom from 1979 to 1990 and the first woman to hold the position; as Margaret Hilda Roberts, in Grantham, Lincolnshire, England (d. 2013)
  - Lenny Bruce, American comedian; as Leonard Schneider, in Mineola, New York, United States (d. 1966, drug overdose)
  - Frank D. Gilroy, American playwright and screenwriter, received the Tony Award for Best Play and the Pulitzer Prize for Drama for his play The Subject Was Roses in 1964; in New York City, United States (d. 2015)

== October 14, 1925 (Wednesday) ==
- The Treaty of Friendship, Commerce and Consular Relations between Germany and the United States of America was ratified in Washington, D.C.
- Dwight F. Davis became United States Secretary of War.
- French forces withdrew from Damascus amid rioting after the French displayed corpses of Druze rebels.
- Landlords in Panama agreed to roll back rent increases to placate angry demonstrators.
- Died:
  - Eugen Sandow, 58, German bodybuilder known as the "father of modern bodybuilding;" died of a ruptured aortic aneurysm (b. 1867)
  - Harold Maxwell-Lefroy, 48, British entomologist who developed insecticides for various pests; died in a laboratory accident while experimenting with poison gases (b. 1877)
  - Samuel M. Ralston, 67, American politician, served as the Governor of Indiana from 1913 to 1917 and as the U.S. Senator from Indiana from 1923 until his death (b. 1857)

== October 15, 1925 (Thursday) ==
- The Pittsburgh Pirates won the World Series, defeating the Washington Senators, 9 to 7, in Game 7.
- Dongdaemun Stadium opened in Seoul, Korea.
- The P.G. Wodehouse novel Sam the Sudden was published.

== October 16, 1925 (Friday) ==
- The Locarno conference ended with several agreements in place. German Foreign Minister Gustav Stresemann gave a closing speech in which he said the conference spelled a new era in European relationships, while French Foreign Minister Aristide Briand said it marked the beginning of a new epoch of cooperation and friendship.
- Frank G. Dickinson, an economics professor at the University of Illinois, first used his "Dickinson System" and announced that he had retroactively concluded that that the unbeaten and untied Fighting Irish of Notre Dame (10–0–0) had been the best team in college football during the 1924 season, followed by California (8–0–2), Yale (6–0–2), Illinois (6–1–1), Stanford (7–1–1), Iowa (6–1–1), USC (9–2–0), Pennsylvania (9-1-1), Dartmouth (7–0–1), Missouri (7–2–0), and Chicago (4–1–3), based on the records of the teams and their opponents.
- Born: Angela Lansbury, British-born American-Irish actress and singer, five time Tony Award winner; in Regent's Park, London, England (d. 2022)

== October 17, 1925 (Saturday) ==
- Twelve people were killed and 20 hurt in a train collision on the Milan–Genoa railway line in Italy.
- The collapse of a section of bleachers at the Washington & Jefferson University stadium in Washington, Pennsylvania, injured 65 spectators during the university's college football game against visiting Carnegie Tech, and caused more than 300 people to fall into Chartiers Creek, and injured 65 of those who fell, two of them seriously. During the third quarter, at 3:55 p.m., the game was scoreless. Play halted immediately as players from both teams went to the aid of people hurt, and the game was ended by the referee 20 minutes later.
- As the Great Syrian Revolt continued, rebels led by Hasan al-Kharrat invaded Damascus in an assault against the French Army. Several colonial French buildings were set on fire and the rebels took control of the Azm Palace, residence of the French High Commissioner Maurice Sarrail, who was not present. During the fighting, 180 French Army personnel were killed, and the rebels settled in the sections of Al-Shaghur and Bab al-Salam, while survivors fled to the Citadel of Damascus.

== October 18, 1925 (Sunday) ==
- The Turkey-Bulgaria Friendship Treaty was signed between the Turkish government and representatives of Turkey's Bulgarian Turks minority, respecting the rights of Bulgarian Christians.
- Byron Khun de Prorok, an American explorer and amateur archaeologist, began the plundering of the Tin Hinan Tomb in the Sahara Desert in French Algeria, over the objections of the local Tuareg Berber community. Located at Abalessa in the Hoggar Mountains, the tomb housed the remains of Tin Hinan, a 4th century AD ruler celebrated by the Tuareg people as the Tamenokalt or Queen of the Tuareg people. Prorok and his team, protected by the French Army, excavated the tomb and took all of its contents, including jewelry and skeletal remains believed to be those of Queen Tin Hinan, and transported them to Algiers for display in the Ethnographical Museum.
- The film Little Annie Rooney starring Mary Pickford was released.
- Wankdorf Stadium opened in Bern, Switzerland.
- Born: Ramiz Alia, Albanian politician, served as the head of state and de jure leader of the People's Socialist Republic of Albania as Chairman of the Presidium from 1985 to 1991, and de facto leader as General Secretary of the Party of Labour of Albania from 1985 to 1991, and later as the President of the Republic of Albania from 1991 to 1992; in Shkodër, Albanian Republic (present-day Albania) (d. 2011)

== October 19, 1925 (Monday) ==
- The "War of the Stray Dog" between Bulgaria and Greece, began near the Bulgarian town of Petrich at the border between the two nations, when at least one Greek soldier standing in his home nation was shot by someone firing from the Bulgarian side. Conflicting accounts exist as to what led up to the incident, but one holds that, the day before, a Greek soldier ran across the border after his dog and was shot by Bulgarian sentries. The Greek version was that Bulgarian soldiers crossed into Greece and killed a Greek Army captain and sentry.
- The French Army carried out the bombardment of the Al-Hariqa section of the capital of the French Mandate of Syria, Damascus, after the Syrian rebel Nur al-Din Bimaristan had taken refuge there with his troops. Artillery was fired by French troops from the Citadel of Damascus.
- Born:
  - Czesław Kiszczak, Polish Army general who served as the nation's Minister of Internal Affairs from 1981 to 1990 during the Communist era of Poland, including the Służba Bezpieczeństwa (SB), Poland's secret police; in Roczyny, Poland (d. 2015)
  - Emilio Eduardo Massera, Argentine Navy admiral who was part of the three-man military junta that overthrew Isabel Person in 1976 and began the South American nation's "Dirty War"; in Paraná, Entre Ríos, Argentina (d. 2010)

== October 20, 1925 (Tuesday) ==
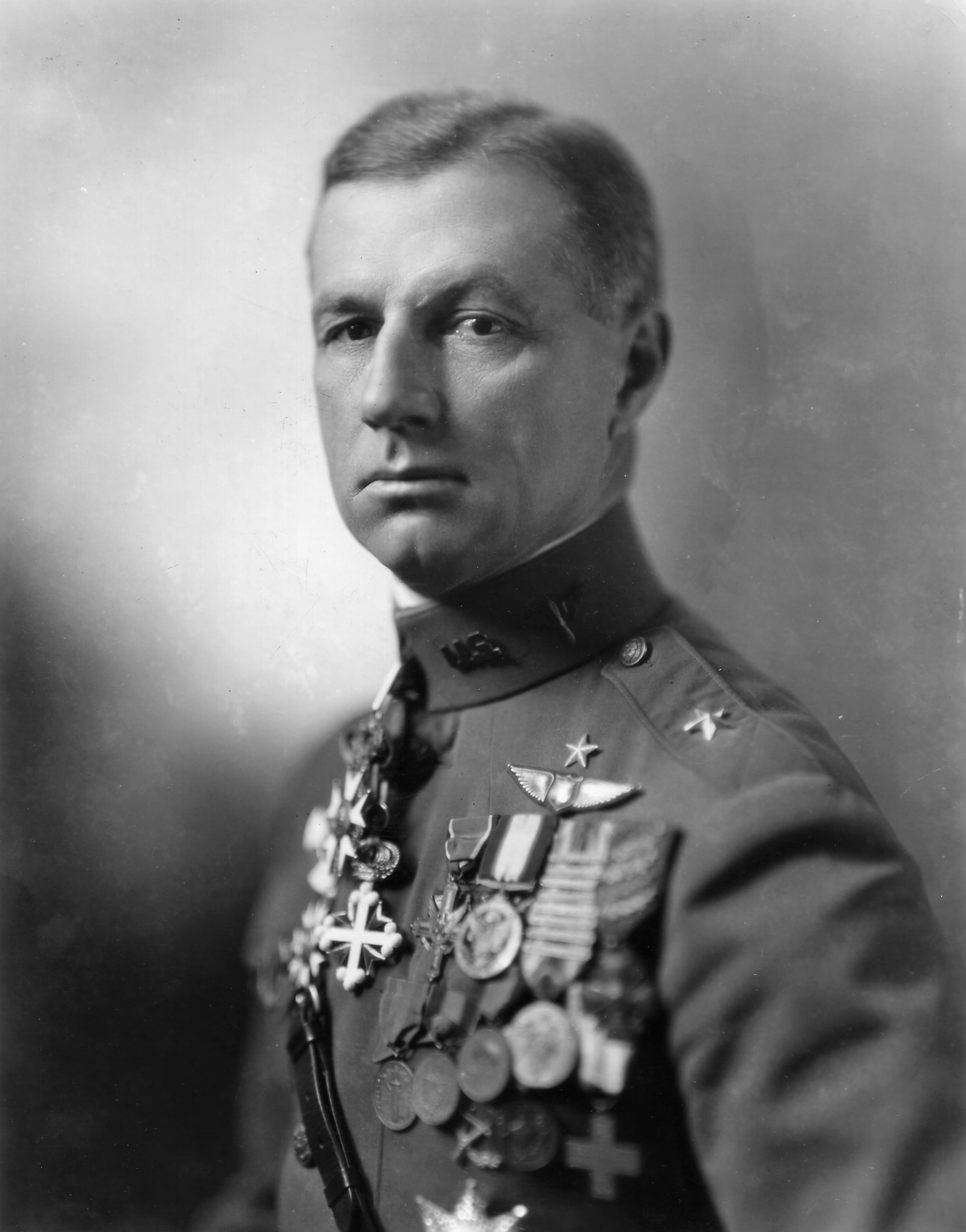
Colonel Mitchell

- U.S. President Calvin Coolidge directed the U.S. Department of War to begin a general court-martial of U.S. Army Colonel Billy Mitchell for insubordination following Colonel Mitchell's September 5 public statement accusing superior officers of "almost treasonable administration of the national defense."
- Born:
  - Art Buchwald, American humorist; as Arthur Buchwald, in New York City, United States (d. 2007)
  - Gene Wood, American television personality; as Eugene Wood, in Quincy, Massachusetts, United States (d. 2004)
  - Robert D. Reem, U.S. Marine Corps officer who was posthumously awarded the Medal of Honor for heroism during the Korean War; in Lancaster, Pennsylvania, United States (d. 1950, killed in action)

== October 21, 1925 (Wednesday) ==
- Greece delivered a 48-hour ultimatum to the Bulgarian government demanding they pay an indemnity and apologize for the Incident at Petrich.
- Born: Celia Cruz, Cuban-American salsa music performer; in Havana, Cuba (d. 2003)
- Died: Marv Goodwin, 34, American professional baseball pitcher; believed to be the first professional athlete to be killed in a plane crash (b. 1891)

== October 22, 1925 (Thursday) ==
- The first direct presidential election in Chile was held with citizens voting heavily for Emiliano Figueroa of the Partido Liberal Democrático, who received more than 70% of the votes cast. Dr. José Santos Salas of the left-wing Unión Social Republicana de Asalariados de Chile (USRACh) received a little less than 29%. Petrich with the intention of enforcing the country's demands for satisfaction.
- Electrical engineer Julius Lilienfeld filed a patent application for a predecessor to the transistor, describing the principle of field electron emission. Canadian patent CA272437A would be granted on July 19, 1927, and U.S. patent 1,754,175 granted on January 28, 1930.
- Born:
  - Robert Rauschenberg, American artist; as Milton Ernest Rauschenberg, in Port Arthur, Texas, United States (d. 2008)
  - George Grindley, New Zealand geologist from whom the Grindley Plateau in Antarctica is named; in Dunedin, New Zealand (d. 2019)
  - Václav Mrázek, Czechoslovak serial killer; in Svinařov, Czechoslovakia (present-day Czech Republic) (d. 1957, hanged)
- Died:
  - Françoise Fillioux, 60, French chef known for her popular restaurant in Lyon (b. 1865)
  - John Tiller, 71, English theatrical director credited with inventing precision dance (b. 1854)

== October 23, 1925 (Friday) ==
- French Foreign Minister Aristide Briand called for an extraordinary session of the League of Nations to resolve the conflict between Greece and Bulgaria.
- Born:
  - Johnny Carson, American comedian and television host known for The Tonight Show from 1962 to 1992; as John Carson, in Corning, Iowa, United States (d. 2005)
  - Manos Hatzidakis, Greek composer, known for "Never on Sunday" winning and refusing an Academy Award for Best Original Song in 1960; as Emmanouil Hatzidakis, in Xanthi, Greece (d. 1994)
  - Fred Shero, Canadian NHL ice hockey coach and general manager known for guiding the Philadelphia Flyers to two consecutive Stanley Cup victories in 1974 and 1975, later an enshrinee at the Hockey Hall of Fame; as Frederick Shero, in Winnipeg, Canada (d. 1990)

== October 24, 1925 (Saturday) ==
- In Britain, the National Association of Boys' Clubs (NABC) was founded to consolidate local clubs of the Boys' and Lads' Club movement. The NABC would change its name in the 1990s to the "National Association of Clubs for Young People" and has been known since 2012 as Ambition.
- Born:
  - Luciano Berio, Italian classical composer; in Oneglia, Kingdom of Italy (present-day Italy) (d. 2003)
  - Al Feldstein, American writer, editor and artist known for being the editor of humor magazine Mad; as Albert Feldstein, in Brooklyn, New York City, United States (d. 2014)
  - Pierre Monichon, French accordionist who invented the harmoneon for large concert halls in 1948; in Lyon, France (d. 2006)
  - John C. Quinn, American journalist and founding editor of USA Today, later served as the president of the Gannett Company; in Providence, Rhode Island, United States (d. 2017)
  - Bob Azzam, Egyptian-born singer; as Wadie George Azzam, in Alexandria, Kingdom of Egypt (present-day Egypt) (d. 2004)

== October 25, 1925 (Sunday) ==
- Former Nicaraguan President Emiliano Chamorro Vargas took over the mountain-top fortress of La Loma overlooking Managua and demanded that President Carlos José Solórzano make him Minister of War.
- Switzerland held elections for all 198 seats of its parliament, the National Council. The Free Democratic Party maintained its plurality of 60 seats, while the Social Democrats gained six to have 49 seats and the Conservative People's Party won 42.
- Wind gusts up to 80 miles per hour (130 km/h) wrecked most of a fleet of 23 U.S. Navy Curtiss CS-1 seaplanes that had been brought to Maryland to compete in the Schneider Cup race. Of the 23 planes, 10 were heavily damaged and seven destroyed.
- Greece and Bulgaria agreed to allow the League of Nations to mediate in their border dispute, the "War of the Stray Dog."
- The romantic comedy film The King on Main Street starring Bessie Love and Adolphe Menjou was released.
- In the Soviet Union, the Kirghiz Autonomous Soviet Socialist Republic opened what is now the Kyrgyz National University, the highest educational institution in the republic of Kyrgyzstan, with a campus at Bishkek.
- Died: Demetrius I Qadi, 64, Syrian Christian cleric and leader of the Melkite Greek Catholic Church as Patriarch of Antioch and All the East from 1919 until his death (b. 1861)

== October 26, 1925 (Monday) ==
- Held in the United States for the first time since the world's foremost international airplane race had been inaugurated in 1913 in England, the Schneider Trophy competition was won by an American pilot who would become famous in World War II for leading the bombing of Tokyo. U.S. Army Lt. Jimmy Doolittle, flew a Curtiss R3C seaplane at a record speed of 232.57 miles per hour (374.29 km/h), shattering the previous record of 177.27 miles per hour (285.29 km/h) set in the 1923 race by David Rittenhouse, the first U.S. pilot to win the competition.
- Nicaragua's President Solórzano acquiesced to Emiliano Chamorro's demand and made him Minister of War, essentially giving him control of the country.
- The League of Nations ordered a cessation of hostilities between Greece and Bulgaria and gave them 24 hours to bring their troops back behind their respective borders.
- The Marx Brothers performed in the Irving Berlin musical, The Cocoanuts (with the dialogue written by George S. Kaufman), as the show premiered for a trial run in Boston, after which it moved to Philadelphia and then to its first Broadway performance on December 8.
- The British-German drama film The Blackguard was released.
- Born: Lars Chemnitz, Greenlandic politician who served as the Chairman of Grønlands Landsråd from 1971 to 1979, and as Speaker of the Inatsisartut from 1998 to 1991; in Godthab, Greenland (present-day Nuuk, Greenland) (d. 2006)
- Died: Job Harriman, 64, American minister and Socialist Party politician who was the running mate of Eugene V. Debs in the 1900 U.S. presidential election, and founded the socialist utopian community of Llano del Rio (b. 1861)

== October 27, 1925 (Tuesday) ==
- U.S. Patent 1,559,390 was issued to inventor Fred Waller for the water ski, which he marketed as "Dolphin Akwa-Skees."
- USS Sequoia, a vessel that would serve a century later as the personal yacht for the President of the United States, was launched after being constructed for Mr. and Mrs. Richard Cadwalader of Philadelphia. After being sold to another multi-millionaire, William Dunning, USS Sequoia would be sold to the U.S. government in 1931 for use by the incumbent U.S. president.
- Born:
  - Warren Christopher, American statesman, attorney, and diplomat, served as the United States Secretary of State from 1993 to 1997; in Scranton, North Dakota, United States (d. 2011)
  - Genrikh Novozhilov, Soviet and Russian aircraft designer known for the Ilyushin Il-62, the first Soviet long-range jet airliner; in Moscow, Russian SFSR, Soviet Union (present-day Russia) (d. 2019)

== October 28, 1925 (Wednesday) ==
- The mummified remains of the Egyptian pharaoh Tutankhamun were found about 3,250 years after his death. Covering Tutankhamun's remains were his death mask, made of gold and lapis lazuli.
- The court-martial of Col. Billy Mitchell began in Washington, D.C.
- The Polish crime film Vampires of Warsaw was released.
- Died: Reverend William J. Leggett, 77, American college football player who was the captain of the Rutgers College team in 1869 for the first college football game (b. 1848)

== October 29, 1925 (Thursday) ==
- Elections were held in Canada for all 245 seats in the House of Commons. The Conservative Party, led by Arthur Meighen, doubled its number of representatives from 49 to 115, a plurality but still short of the 123 needed for a majority. Prime Minister King himself and seven ministers in the government lost parliamentary seats." Nevertheless, the Governor-General, Viscount Byng of Vimy, invited Prime Minister Mackenzie King, whose Liberal Party went from 118 to 100 seats, to attempt to form a new government. A coalition was created between the Liberals and the Progressive Party with a total of 176 seats to stay in power.
- The Balkan crisis ended as Greece completed its withdrawal from Bulgaria. The League of Nations said it would appoint a commission to assign responsibilities and assess damages.
- In Buffalo, New York, a group of six gunmen hijacked an armored truck that was making a delivery of cash to the Bank of Buffalo, killed two messengers, then stole $93,000 in cash. The money was never recovered, and although Richard Reese Whittemore was indicted for the holdup, a jury could not agree on whether he was guilty. Whittemore was then turned for trial on a murder charge in Maryland, where he was convicted and hanged the following August.
- Waddy Thompson Ligon, a 73-year-old man, was killed when his converted Model T slid off a narrow road south of Lees Ferry and jammed into a crevasse of the Grand Canyon.
- Born:
  - Klaus Roth, German-born British mathematician known for Roth's theorem on the diophantine approximation of algebraic numbers; in Breslau, Niedersachsen, Germany (present-day Wrocław, Poland) (d. 2015)
  - Dominick Dunne, American writer and journalist; in Hartford, Connecticut, United States (d. 2009)
  - Larry Siegel, American comedy writer and screenwriter known for The Carol Burnett Show and winner of three Emmy Awards; as Lawrence Siegel, in New York City, United States (d. 2019)
  - Robert Hardy, English actor; as Timothy Sydney Robert Hardy, in Cheltenham, Gloucestershire, England (d. 2017)
  - Stanley Dissanaike, Sri Lankan parasitologist for whom Bilorchis dissanaikei and Plasmodium dissanaikei are named; in Colombo, British Ceylon (present-day Sri Lanka) (d. 2015)

== October 30, 1925 (Friday) ==
- Maurice Monguillo, the Governor-General of French Indochina, issued a decree for colonial government protection of Cambodia's Angkor Wat ruins.
- The Franz Lehár operetta Paganini was performed for the first time, premiering in Vienna at the Johann Strauss Theater with Carl Clewing in the title role.
- The murder trial of Ossian Sweet began with an all-white jury and Clarence Darrow representing the defense.
- Born:
  - Wolfgang Vogel, East German lawyer and prisoner exchange negotiator; in Wilhelmstal, Niederschlesien, Germany (present-day Boleslawów, Poland) (d. 2008)
  - Audrey Eagle, New Zealand botanical author and illustrator known for Eagle's Complete Trees and Shrubs of New Zealand; as Audrey Brodey, in Timaru, New Zealand (d. 2022)

== October 31, 1925 (Saturday) ==
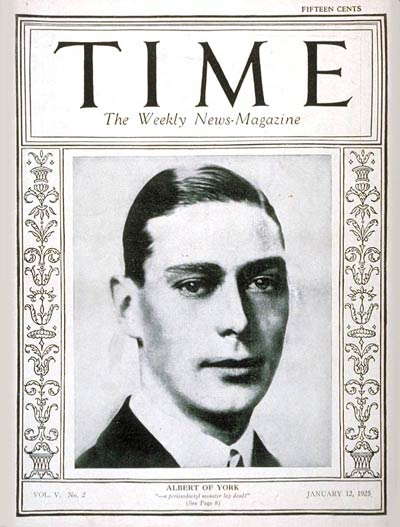
Albert, Duke of York, in 1925

- The British Empire Exhibition closed at Empire Stadium near London in a ceremony delivered to the crowd by electric sound amplifiers, though not on radio. For the closing, King George's son Albert, Duke of York (who was also president of the Exhibition) addressed the crowd of 40,000 people, in addition to participants on the field, delivering a message from the King, followed by a short speech. Though not reported in the press, the Duke, because of a stammer and his fear of public speaking, had difficulty in carrying out the task. The incident, and his subsequent work on overcoming the problem, would later be dramatized in the 2010 film The King's Speech.
- The Persian Parliament formally deposed the exiled Shah of Persia, Ahmad Shah Qajar, ending the Qajar dynasty and clearing the path for Prime Minister Reza Khan to assume the throne on December 15. Ahmad Shah who had been the monarch since 1909, had left Persia in 1923 and exiled himself to France.
- Born:
  - John Pople, British theoretical chemist and 1998 Nobel Prize in Chemistry laureate for his development of computational chemistry analysis with Walter Kohn; in Burnham-on-Sea, Somerset, England (d. 2004)
  - Lee Grant, American actress and film director; as Lyova Rosenthal, in New York City, United States (alive in 2026)
  - K. P. Atma, Indian journalist and film producer and director, known for his Telugu language films, including Bharya Bhartalu (1961); as Kolli Kotayya Pratyagatma, in Gudivada, Presidency of Fort St. George, British India (present-day Andhra Pradesh, India) (d. 2001)
- Died:
  - Mikhail Frunze, 40, Soviet Union Commissar for Military and Naval Affairs; died during a routine operation for a stomach ulcer (b. 1885) On instructions from Joseph Stalin, who had recommended the surgery, Frunze had been administered a large dose of ether and chloroform in the operating room.
  - George "Dutch" Anderson, 44-45, Danish-born American armed robber and killer; died in a gunfight with a local police officer, Charles Hammond, in Muskegon, Michigan (b. c. 1880). Hammond was fatally wounded, but was able to wrestle Anderson's pistol loose and then use it to shoot and kill Anderson before dying.
