= November 1925 =

Month of 1925

<<	November 1925					>>
Su	Mo	Tu	We	Th	Fr	Sa
1	2	3	4	5	6	7
8	9	10	11	12	13	14
15	16	17	18	19	20	21
22	23	24	25	26	27	28
29	30

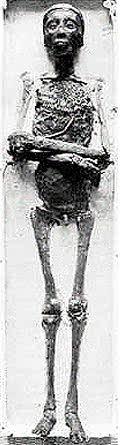
November 11, 1925: Remains of King Tutankhamun of Egypt seen for the first time in more than 33 centuries

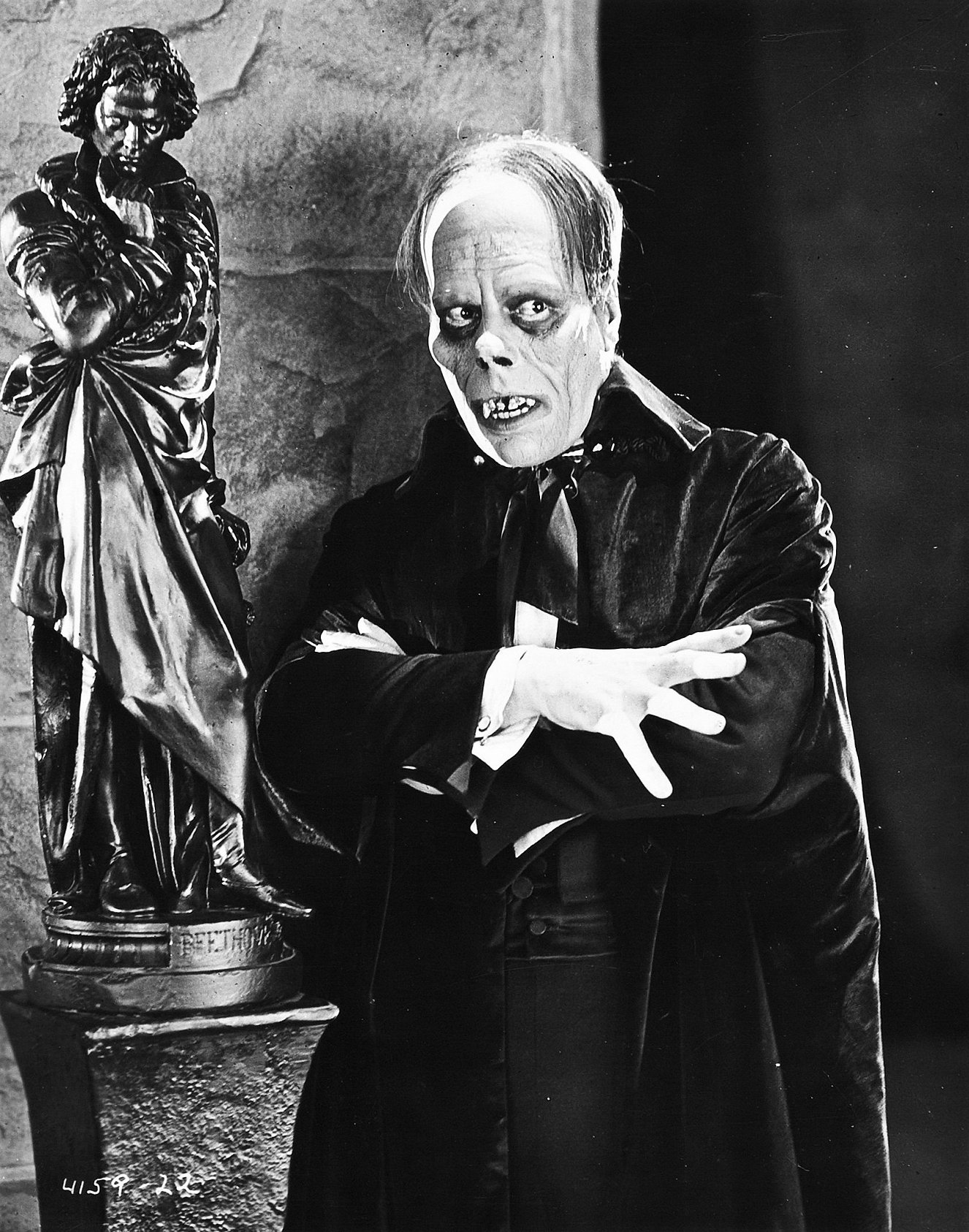
November 15, 1925: Lon Chaney stuns film audiences with The Phantom of the Opera

The following events occurred in November 1925:

== November 1, 1925 (Sunday) ==
- A mine explosion killed 17 miners near Gelsenkirchen in Germany.
- In British India, the Sikh Gurdwaras Act, 1925 went into effect, bringing the houses of worship of the Sikh religion (gurdwaras) under the control of an elected body of orthodox Sikhs and defining a Sikh adherent by a person who solemnly affirmed their belief in the Guru Granth Sahib and the Ten Gurus.
- The Buster Keaton film Go West opened.
- Died:
  - Lester Cuneo, 37, American film actor and director; committed suicide with a gunshot to the head (b. 1888)
  - Max Linder, 41, French actor and comedian; committed suicide along with his wife, Helene Peters Linder (b. 1883) The two had taken several doses of the barbiturate Veronal and several injections of morphine before slashing their wrists in their room at the Hotel Baltimore in Paris.

== November 2, 1925 (Monday) ==
- A dam burst killed 16 people in the village of Dolgarrog in Wales after five days of heavy rains caused the Llyn Eigiau dam to fail. Water from a reservoir held back by the dam then flowed downhill to the Coedty Reservoir, which then burst its dam and swept away homes in the Conwy Valley community and inundated the village.
- The Victor Talking Machine Company, now part of RCA Victor, introduced breakthrough sound technology with the unveiling of its new electrically-recorded phonograph records, which could be played at their optimum level on the Victor Orthophonic Victrola phonograph. Starting price for the new Orthophonic was $95 (equivalent to almost $1,700 a century later).
- In Australia, about 100 police clashed with an estimated 1,000 striking seamen on the wharf in Fremantle. The confrontation began as the officers tried to board a ship that the strikers were trying to damage. About 100 people were arrested.
- The unidentified body of a young Polish Army soldier, killed in the Battle of Lemberg during the Polish-Ukrainian War, was interred in the Tomb of the Unknown Soldier (Grób Nieznanego Żołnierza) in Warsaw.
- The operetta Princess Flavia opened on Broadway.
- The Emperor's Cup the championship tournament of Japanese soccer football, was won by defending champion Rijo Shukyu-Dan, 3 to 0 over the Tokyo Imperial University team.

== November 3, 1925 (Tuesday) ==
- Jimmy Walker was elected as the 97th Mayor of New York City, to replace Mayor John Francis Hylan, whom he had defeated in the Democratic primary election on September 15. Walker easily defeated Republican nominee Frank D. Waterman in the general election.
- At the age of 21, film actress Constance Bennett married millionaire socialite Philip Morgan Plant in a hotel lobby in Greenwich, Connecticut. She would not make another film until they divorced in 1929.
- Born: George Eiferman, American bodybuilder and trainer; in Philadelphia, United States (d. 2002)
- Died: Lucile McVey, 35, American actress, part of the husband-and-wife comedy team Mr. & Mrs. Sidney Drew; died from cancer (b. 1890)

== November 4, 1925 (Wednesday) ==
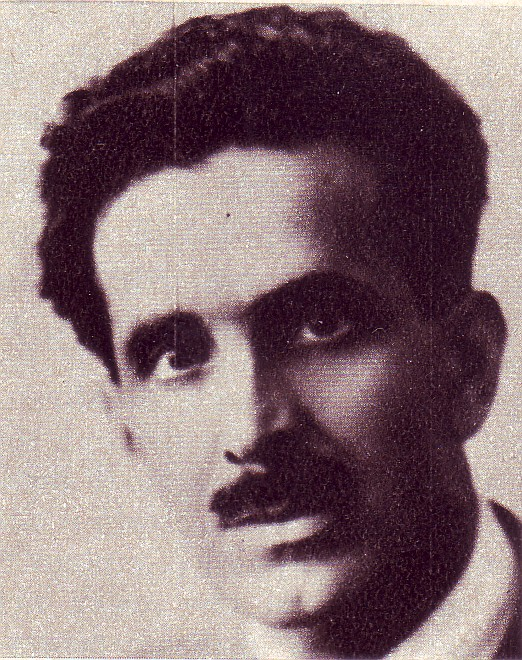
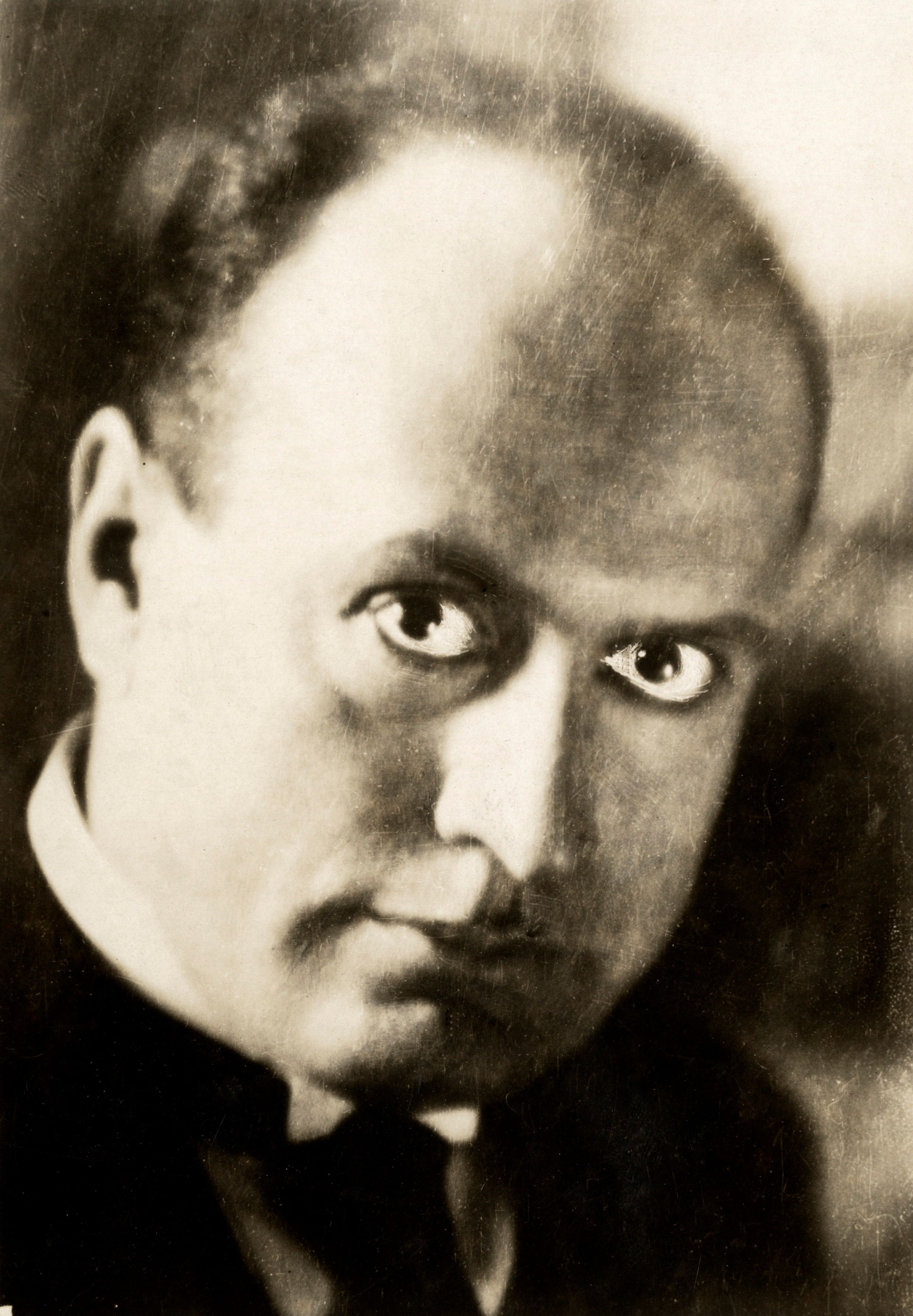
Zaniboni and his target, Mussolini
- Italian Socialist deputy Tito Zaniboni, an expert marksman, was arrested in a room at the Dragoni Hotel, which he had reserved across from the Palazzo Chigi, with the intent of shooting Benito Mussolini with a telescopic-sight rifle when the Italian Prime Minister was scheduled to come out to the balcony to make a speech. Police had been tipped off by an phone call from an informant who had posed as a friend of Zaniboni, and broke into the hotel room after Zaniboni had set up a sniper's nest, but before Mussolini came out to the balcony.
- Elections were held in New Zealand for all 80 seats of the House of Representatives. The ruling Reform Party, led by Prime Minister Gordon Coates, won 56 seats, well more than the 41 needed for a majority
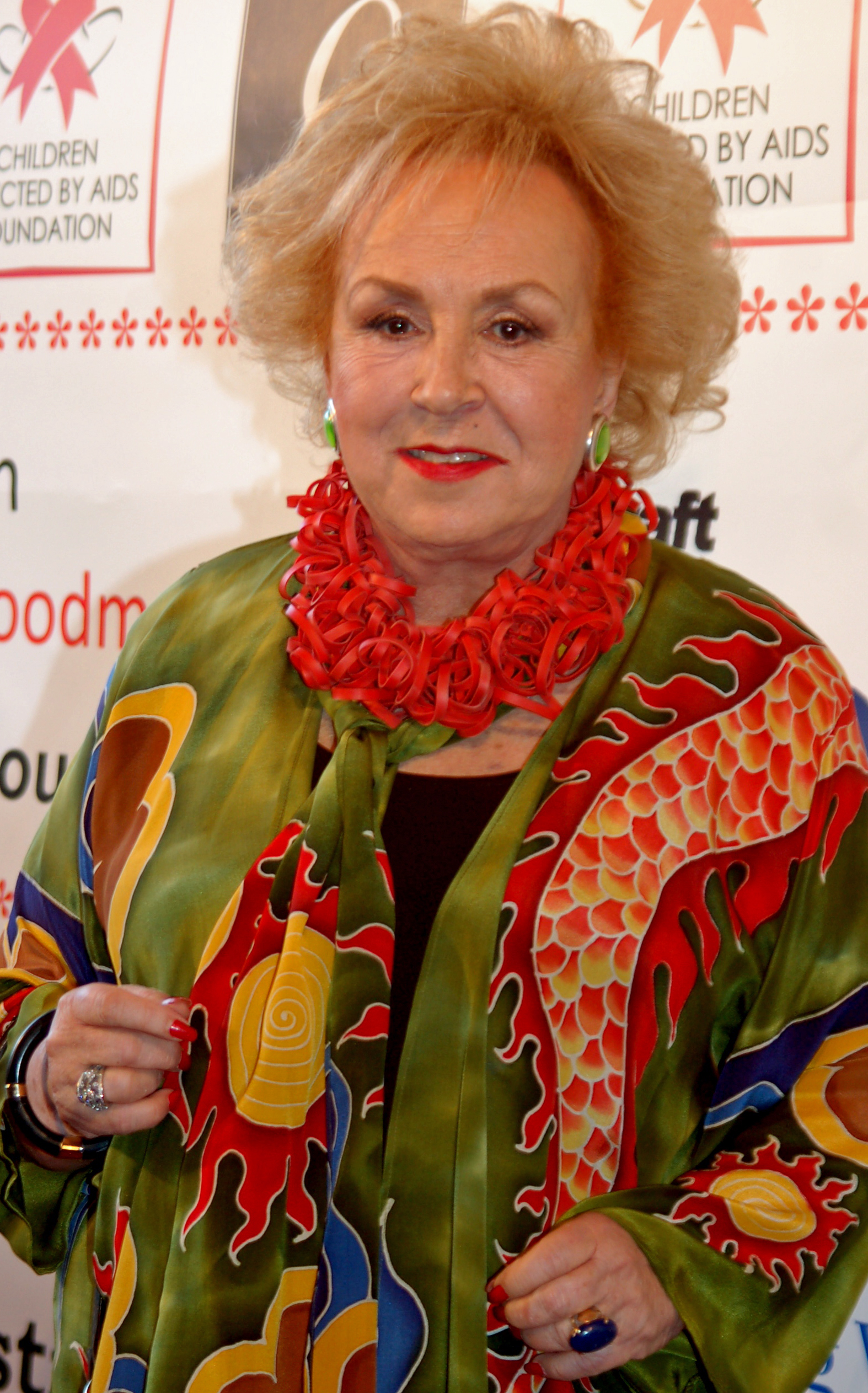
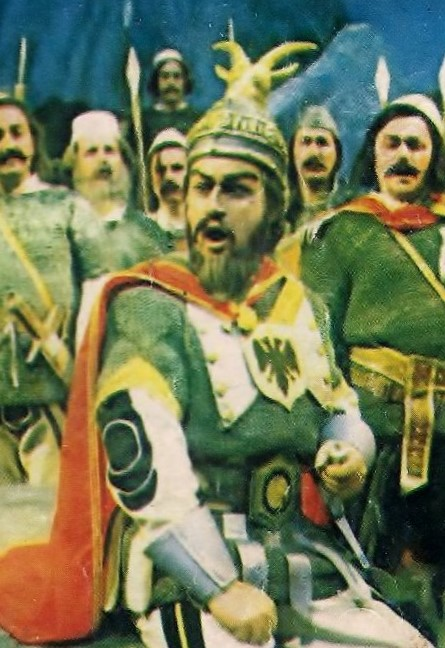
Roberts and Athanas
- Born:
  - Bobby Breen, Canadian-born American actor and singer; as Isadore Borsuk, in Montreal, Canada (d. 2016)
  - Doris Roberts, American actress and comedienne best known for Everybody Loves Raymond, for which she won four Emmy Awards for Best Supporting Actress; as Doris May Green, in St. Louis, Missouri, United States (d. 2016)
  - Xhoni Athanas, Albanian-American operatic tenor; in Brockton, Massachusetts, United States (d. 2019)
  - Helene Stanton, American singer, actress and operatic soprano; as Eleanor Mae Stansbury, in Philadelphia, United States (d. 2017)

== November 5, 1925 (Thursday) ==
- The most popular film of 1925, The Big Parade, distributed by MGM and directed by King Vidor, premiered at Grauman's Egyptian Theatre in Hollywood. Produced on a budget of $400,000 and grossing 15 times that much in rentals and sales, The Big Parade realized a profit for MGM of more than five million dollars.
- The Italian language opera L'Orfeide, composed by Gian Francesco Malipiero and based upon the myth of Orpheus, was performed for the first time, premiering in Germany at the Opernhaus Düsseldorf.
- Died:
  - Sidney Reilly, 51, Russian-born British spy for the Secret Service Bureau, Foreign Section; executed by the OGPU, the secret police of the Soviet Union (b. c. 1873)
  - John Newport Langley, 73, British physiologist and neuroscientist known for proposing the concept of the parasympathetic nervous system and for coining the term "autonomic nervous system" (b. 1852)

== November 6, 1925 (Friday) ==
- The election for President of Latvia was made by an electoral college in Riga. With 94 electors casting votes, and 48 needed for a majority, incumbent president Janis Cakste received only 29 votes, author Janis Plieksans had 33, and former prime minister Karlis Ulmanis 32. Plieskans withdrew from the race and on the second ballot, President Cakste was re-elected with 60 votes against 34 for Ulmanis.
- Kliment Voroshilov was appointed Soviet Union Commissar for Military and Naval Affairs following the death of Mikhail Frunze.
- The Dow Jones Industrial Average closed at 159.39 points. This was the 65th record close of the calendar year 1925, a record in itself almost doubling the old mark of 34 record closes set in 1899. The record stood until 1995.
- Khai Dinh, the 40-year-old Emperor of Vietnam under the French Protectorate since 1916, died from tuberculosis at his home in the Imperial City of Huế. The task of governing Vietnam was then worked out by a convention between French colonial and Vietnamese leaders providing for a Vietnamese regency council (Hội đồng thượng thư) to decide domestic matters, and leaving most power with the French Cochinchina protectorate governor Maurice Cognacq and the French Indochina Governor-General, Alexandre Varenne. Khai Dinh was succeeded by his 12-year-old son, Prince Nguyen Phuc Vinh Thuy, who was formally enthroned on January 8 as the Emperor Bao Dai.
- The Sergei Prokofiev ballet Trapèze premiered in Germany at a theater in the town of Gotha.
- Born:
  - Michel Bouquet, French film actor and winner of two César Awards for Best Actor for Comment j'ai tué mon père (2001) and Le Promeneur du Champ de Mars (2005); in Paris, France (d. 2022)
  - Nan Winton, British broadcaster known for becoming the first female BBC national television newsreader in 1960; as Nancy Wigginton, in Southsea, Hampshire, England (d. 2019)
- Died: Khải Định, 40, Emperor of Vietnam from 1916 until his death; died of tuberculosis (b. 1885)

== November 7, 1925 (Saturday) ==
- The Indian Hockey Federation (IHF), governing body for the sport of field hockey in India for almost 90 years, was founded in Gwalior (now in Madhya Pradesh). Within three years, the India men's national field hockey team would win the gold medal in the 1928 Summer Olympics. It would exist until it was replaced by Hockey India in 2009.
- Pittsburgh was granted a franchise by the National Hockey League. The club was named the Pirates, after the baseball team also based in the city.
- Several Italian opposition leaders were arrested in connection with the assassination attempt on Benito Mussolini.
- France announced that the remains of Manfred von Richthofen, "The Red Baron", would be disinterred from France and repatriated to Germany.

== November 8, 1925 (Sunday) ==
- Parliamentary elections were held in Portugal for the 163 seats of the Câmara dos Deputados. With 82 seats needed for a majority, the Partido Democrático of Prime Minister Domingos Pereira gained nine to hold 83 seats, while the Partido Republicano Nacionalista of former premier António Maria da Silva lost 15 to win only 36 seats.
- The film The Eagle, starring Rudolph Valentino, was released.

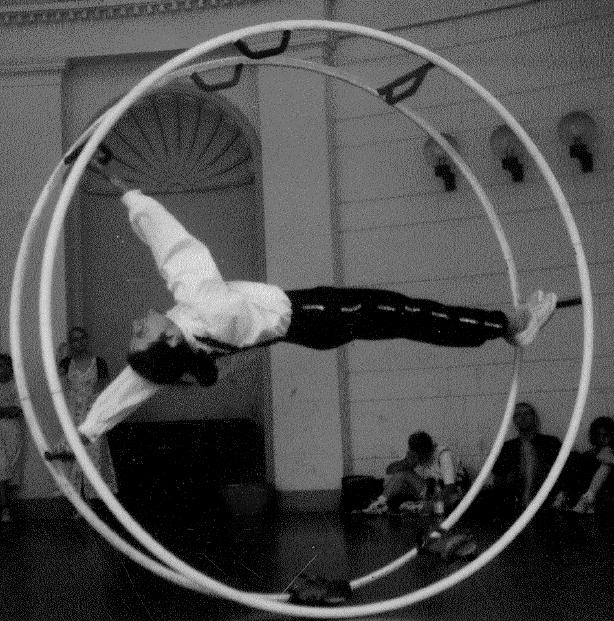
The "Rhönrad"

- German patent No. 442,057 for the "Rhönrad", a metal wheel used by gymnasts in the specialized sport of wheel gymnastics, was issued to Otto Feick.
- Born: Francisco Granizo, Ecuadorian poet; in Quito, Ecuador (d. 2009)
- Died:
  - Domício da Gama, 63, Brazilian journalist and diplomat (b. 1862)
  - Paul Héger, 78, Belgian chemist (b. 1846)

== November 9, 1925 (Monday) ==
- Forces allied with Chinese warlord Wu Peifu of the Zhili clique defeated warlord Zhang Zuolin of the Fengtian clique after several days of fighting south of Xuzhou in Jiangsu province.
- The Kip Rhinelander divorce trial opened in White Plains, New York. Rhinelander was seeking an annulment of the marriage because his wife Alice had failed to inform him of her "colored" blood before the wedding. The trial was a significant media circus event at the time.
- The race film Body and Soul was released, directed by Oscar Micheaux and starring Paul Robeson in his film debut.
- Born: Fred Jordan, Austrian-born American publisher and business manager who fought for the publication of the original, uncensored versions, of numerous novels including Lady Chatterley's Lover, Tropic of Cancer, and The Naked Lunch; as Alfred Rotblatt, in Vienna, Austria (d. 2021)

== November 10, 1925 (Tuesday) ==
- The Archbishop of Canterbury appointed a committee of six doctors and six clergymen to investigate the veracity of faith healing.
- Born: Richard Burton, Welsh stage and film actor, winner of a Tony Award for Best Actor in a Musical for Camelot, seven-time nominee for an Academy Award without winning; as Richard Walter Jenkins Jr., in Pontrhydyfen, Glamorgan (d. 1984)

== November 11, 1925 (Wednesday) ==
- Howard Carter and an autopsy team began the unwrapping of the mummy of Pharaoh Tutankhamun. The process was exceedingly difficult due to the extreme fragility of the bandages and the resinous coating that held the mummy fast inside the sarcophagus.
- The Civil and Commercial Code of Thailand, codifying a common law for the civil cases in the Kingdom of Siam, was promulgated for use across the nation's courts, with the release of Books I and II.
- The Great White Train, part of a promotion by the Australia Made Preference League began a six-month tour of the state of New South Wales, lasting until May 20, 1926. With a locomotive pulling 19 cars (15 exhibition coaches, two passenger carriages, a sleeping car and a dining car), it was 309 metres (1,014 ft) long and the longest train, up that time, to operate in Australia. The first tour of New South Wales made 61 stops after departing Sydney and running from Gosford to Granville. A second New South Wales tour of three months began the following spring on August 25, 1926.
- Hendrikus Colijn, Prime Minister of the Netherlands, announced his resignation along with his entire cabinet, though a new government would not be formed until four months later on March 8.
- Le Faisceau, a French Fascist party, was founded, consisting of about 10,000 members.
- The Czech language opera Šárka, written by Leoš Janáček in 1887 but never produced, was performed for the first time after 38 years, premiering at Brno at the Divadlo na Hradbách.
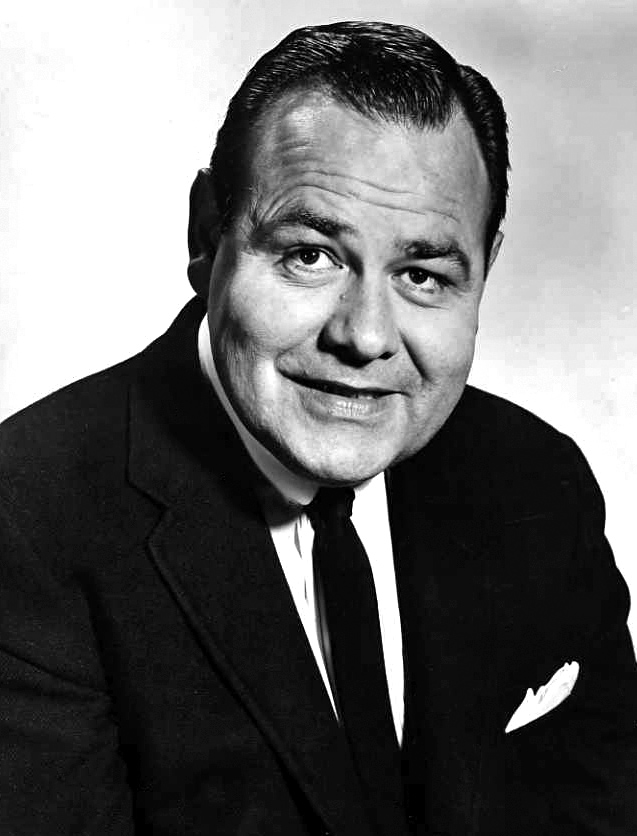
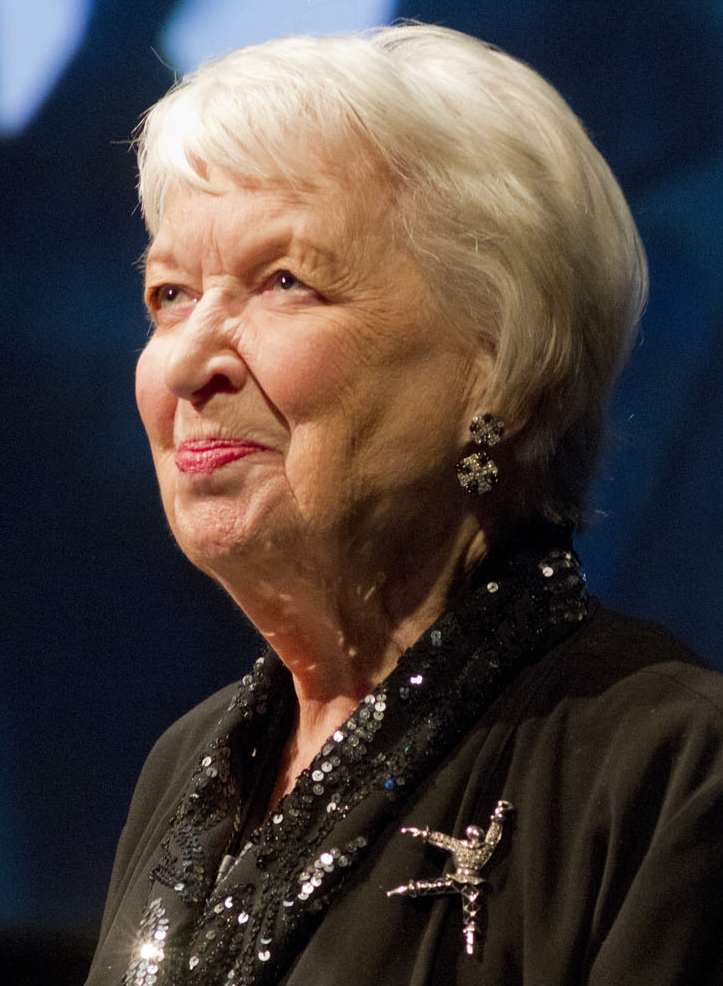
Jonathan Winters and June Whitfield
- Born:
  - John Guillermin, English film director known for Tarzan's Greatest Adventure (1958), The Bridge at Remagen (1969), The Towering Inferno (1974), and Death on the Nile (1978); as Yvon Jean Guillermanm, in London, England (d. 2015)
  - Jonathan Winters, American comedian and actor; in Bellbrook, Ohio, United States (d. 2013)
  - Kola Ogunmola, Nigerian actor and director; as Elijah Kolawole Ogunmola, in Okemesi, British Nigeria (present-day Nigeria) (d. 1973)
  - June Whitfield, British actress; in Streatham, London, England (d. 2018)
  - Pham Van Ut, South Vietnamese military officer and politician, served as the last Speaker of the House of Representatives of South Vietnam before the Fall of Saigon; in Sa Dec, Dong Thap Province, Cochinchina, French Indochina (present-day Vietnam) (d. 2002)
- Died: Clara Weaver Parrish, 64, American painter (b. 1861)

== November 12, 1925 (Thursday) ==
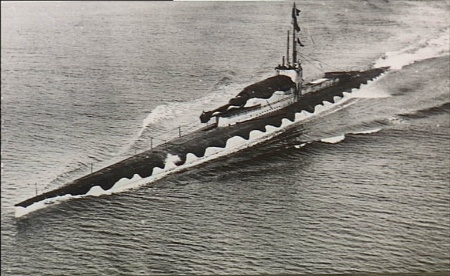
HMS M1 before its sinking

- The British submarine HMS M1 sank in the English Channel with all 69 of its crew after it was hit by the Swedish ship SS Vidar.
- Louis Armstrong and His Hot Five (himself, his wife Lil Hardin Armstrong on piano, Edward "Kid" Ory on trombone, Johnny Dodds on clarinet and Johnny St. Cyr on guitar and banjo) recorded their first songs together for Okeh Records. These recordings were among the most important and influential in the development of jazz music.
- The Italian government agreed to repay its war debt to the United States with a fixed interest rate of 0.4 percent.

== November 13, 1925 (Friday) ==
- Poland's Prime Minister Władysław Grabski and his cabinet of ministers resigned over the difference of opinion with the president of the Bank Polski SA, the nation's central bank, over how to stabilize the zloty. Foreign Minister Aleksander Skrzyński worked at forming a new government.
- La Peinture surrealiste, the world's first Surrealist art exhibition opened at 12:01 a.m. at the Galerie Pierre in Paris. The gallery featured 19 paintings by artists Joan Miró, Hans Arp, Giorgio de Chirico, Max Ernst, Paul Klee, André Masson, Pablo Picasso, Man Ray and Pierre Roy.
- Nearly 25 years after the first striking of petroleum (on January 10, 1901) in the Spindletop oil field, at the time the largest in the United States, drilling by the Yount-Lee Oil Company at the same field near Beaumont, Texas struck a second pool of oil at a depth of 2,500 feet (760 m).
- Died:
  - Charles McDonald, 65, Australian politician who had served in parliament from 1901 until his death, served as the Speaker of the Australian House of Representatives from 1910 to 1913 and 1914 to 1917; died of cerebrovascular disease the day before the parliamentary election (b. 1860)
  - Samuzzo Amatuna, 27, Italian-born American mobster, leader of the Genna Brothers crime family and served as president of the Unione Sicliana; died three days after being shot twice in the chest at a barbershop (b. 1898)
  - Fiorina Cecchin, 48, Italian Roman Catholic missionary known for her care and activism for poor and ill children in Kenya, beatified by the Vatican 97 years after her death; died of illness while traveling on the steamship Porto Alessandreta on the Red Sea (b. 1877)

== November 14, 1925 (Saturday) ==
- Voting was held in Australia for all 75 seats of the House of Representatives and 22 of the 36 seats of the Australian Senate. The Nationalist Party of Prime Minister Stanley Bruce gained 11 seats in the House to increase its share to 37 of the seats and its Coalition partner, the Country Party, won 13 to combine for a 51-seat hold. The Australian Labor Party (ALP) of Matthew Charlton finished second with 24 seats. In the Senate, the Coalition's lead over the ALP increased from 24-12 to 28-8 as the ALP lost four seats to the Country Party. This was the first Australian federal election to have compulsory voting.
- D. C. Stephenson, who had been the Grand Dragon who led the Ku Klux Klan of the U.S. state of Indiana, and built Klan membership in that state to 250,000 men, was convicted of the April 14 rape and murder of Madge Oberholtzer, and sentenced to life imprisonment. After Indiana Governor Edward L. Jackson denied Stephenson's request for a pardon, Stephenson would retaliate by sending a list to the Indianapolis Times, identifying every elected official in the state who had received payment from the Klan.
- Test broadcasting began in Dublin for what is now RTÉ Radio (Raidió Teilifís Éireann) as Seamus Clandillon, director of the first radio broadcasting station in the Irish Free State, 2RN, went on the air with the test phrase "Seo Raidió 2RN, Baile Átha Cliath ag tástáil" ("This is Radio 2RN, Dublin calling"). Full broadcasting was scheduled to begin on January 1.
- Born:
  - Roy Medvedev, Soviet Russian dissident and historian known for writing Let History Judge in 1969, twin brother of Zhores Medvedev; in Tbilisi, Transcaucasian SFSR, Soviet Union (present-day Georgia) (d. 2026)
  - Zhores Medvedev, Soviet Russian plant biologist, dissident and historian, who published Protein Biosynthesis and Problems of Heredity Development and Aging and, after being dismissed from his position as director of molecular radiobiology at the Institute of Medical Radiology, wrote the unauthorized book published in the West as The Rise and Fall of T.D. Lysenko, twin brother of Roy Medvedev; in Tbilisi, Transcaucasian SFSR, Soviet Union (present-day Georgia) (d. 2018)

== November 15, 1925 (Sunday) ==
- The first national professional basketball league in the United States, the American Basketball League (ABL), stretching from Boston to Chicago, opened its inaugural season with nine teams. In the ABL opener, played at Arcadia Hall in Brooklyn in New York City, as the Washington Palace Five (owned by future NFL Washington Redskins owner George Preston Marshall) defeated the Brooklyn Arcadians, 32 to 30. Founded by National Football League president Joseph F. Carr, the ABL's opening season featured Brooklyn and Washington, as well as the Boston Whirlwinds, Buffalo Bisons, Chicago Bruins, Cleveland Rosenblums, Detroit Pulaski Post Five , Fort Wayne (IN) Caseys and Rochester Centrals.

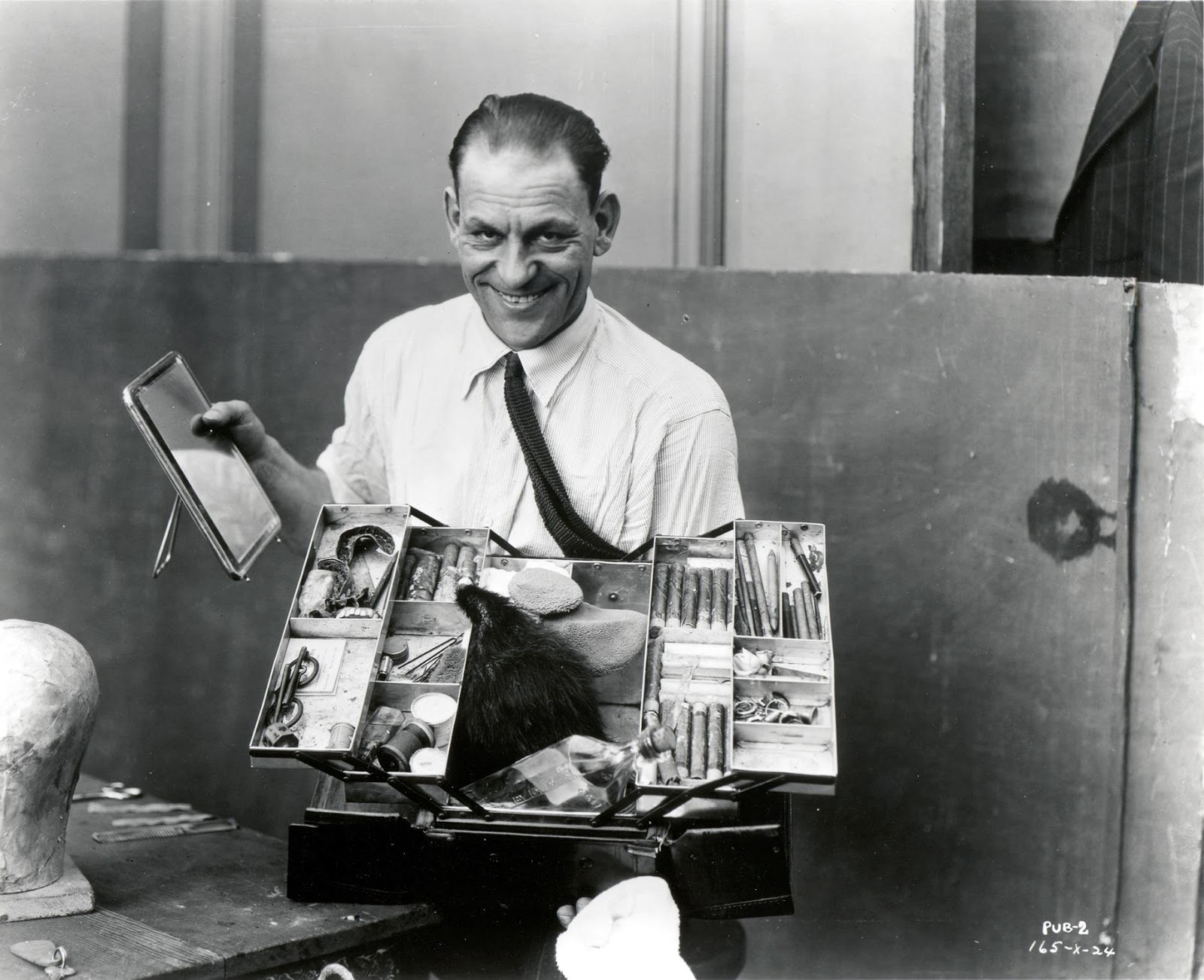
Chaney with his makeup kit

- The film The Phantom of the Opera, marking the debut of Lon Chaney as a horror film star, made its nationwide debut in the United States, opening in New York. Chaney, who did his own makeup, surprised audiences with his transformation into the Phantom, with a more realistic portrayal of a monster than had previously been seen on stage or on film.
- Parliamentary elections were held in Czechoslovakia for all 300 seats of the Chamber of Deputies (poslanecké sněmovny or poslaneckej snemovne) and all 150 seats of the Senátu. The RSZML, led by Prime Minister Antonín Švehla formed a coalition with three other major parties (Czechoslovak People's Party, Social Democratic Workers, and Socialists) to continue governing.
- About 2,000 German Fascist followers of Erich Ludendorff gathered in front of the Berlin City Palace to protest the Locarno Treaties.
- The Cecil B. DeMille-directed film The Road to Yesterday was released.

== November 16, 1925 (Monday) ==
- "Zur Quantenmechanik II" ("On Quantum Mechanics, part II"), by Max Born, Werner Heisenberg and Pascual Jordan, the third of the trilogy of scientific papers credited with launching the matrix mechanics formulation of quantum mechanics, was received for publication by the journal Zeitschrift für Physik, which had published Heisenberg's Umdeutung paper and Born's and Jordan's ""Zur Quantenmechanik".
- The U.S. automaker General Motors purchased ownership of the British manufacturer Vauxhall Motors for U.S.$2.5 million.
- The film Stage Struck was released.
- Born: Lawrence W. Jones, American physicist and specialist in high energy particle physics; in Evanston, Illinois, United States (d. 2023)

== November 17, 1925 (Tuesday) ==
- The New Zealand and South Seas International Exhibition, the third world's fair at the nation, opened in Dunedin for a run of five and a half months, closing on May 1, 1926 after three million visitors had attended.
- Elections were held in Burma (now Myanmar) for the 80 elected seats of the 103-seat advisory Legislative Council. The Nationalist Party received more votes (25) than any other, but was unable to form a government. Voter turnout was only 16% of the eligible voters.
- Danish electronics company Bang & Olufsen was founded by Peter Bang and Svend Olufsen.
- Born:
  - Rock Hudson, American actor known for his roles in Pillow Talk (1959) and McMillan & Wife; as Roy Scherer, Jr., in Winnetka, Illinois, United States (d. 1985, of complications from AIDS)
  - Elizabeth Connell, American physician and advocate for contraception and abortion rights; as Elizabeth Bishop, in Springfield, Massachusetts, United States (d. 2018)
  - Horst Naumann, German actor known for The Doctor of St. Pauli (1968); in Dresden, Germany (d. 2024)
- Died:
  - Guy Rose, 58, American impressionist painter; died following complications from a stroke in 1921 (b. 1867)
  - Fritz Angerstein, 34, German mass murderer of eight people; was beheaded at the Freiendiez Central Prison in Diez-an-der-Lahn (b. 1891)

== November 18, 1925 (Wednesday) ==
- The British House of Commons ratified the Locarno Treaties by a vote of 375 to 13.
- Giulio Rodinò, the highest-ranking non-Fascist member of Italy's lower house of parliament, the Camera dei Deputati resigned in protest as vice-president of the Camera after delivering a speech attacking the increasingly authoritarian nature of the Fascist government. Within a year, he and other opposition members would be driven out of the Camera altogether.
- Born:
  - Peng Shilu, Chinese nuclear engineer who was the chief designer of the nuclear submarines developed by the People's Republic of China; in Haifeng, Guangdong province, Republic of China (present-day China) (d. 2021)
  - Philip Effiong, Nigerian military officer and politician who served as the last president of the secessionist Republic of Biafra, after serving as the breakaway state's vice president from 1967 to 1970 during the Nigerian Civil War; as Oblong Philip Effiong, in Ibiono Ibom, British Nigeria (present-day Nigeria) (d. 2003)
  - Gene Mauch, American professional baseball player and manager; in Salina, Kansas, United States (d. 2005)

== November 19, 1925 (Thursday) ==
- President Coolidge called for the United States to join the World Court in an address to the New York State Chamber of Commerce.
- The autopsy of Tutankhamun concluded. The bad condition of the body and limited forensic science of the 1920s meant that little could be determined other than the age of the body being estimated to be about eighteen.
- Born:
  - Salil Chowdhury, Bengali Indian film score composer for more than 150 movies; in Ghazipur, 24 Parganas district, Bengal Presidency, British India (present-day Baruipur, South 24 Parganas, West Bengal, India) (d. 1995)
  - Des Rowe, Australian rules footballer and captain of the Richmond Tigers of the Victorian Football League, later its head coach; as Kenneth Desmond Rowe, in Australia (d. 2007)
- Died: Pyotr Vologodsky, 62, anti-Bolshevik Russian statesman and White Army leader who served as the first prime minister of the rival Russian State at its capital of Omsk from 1918 to 1919 (b. 1863)

== November 20, 1925 (Friday) ==
- Aleksander Skrzyński became Prime Minister of Poland.
- A state funeral was held for Manfred von Richthofen as his repatriated remains were buried in the Invalidenfriedhof in Berlin. President Paul von Hindenburg led the proceedings.
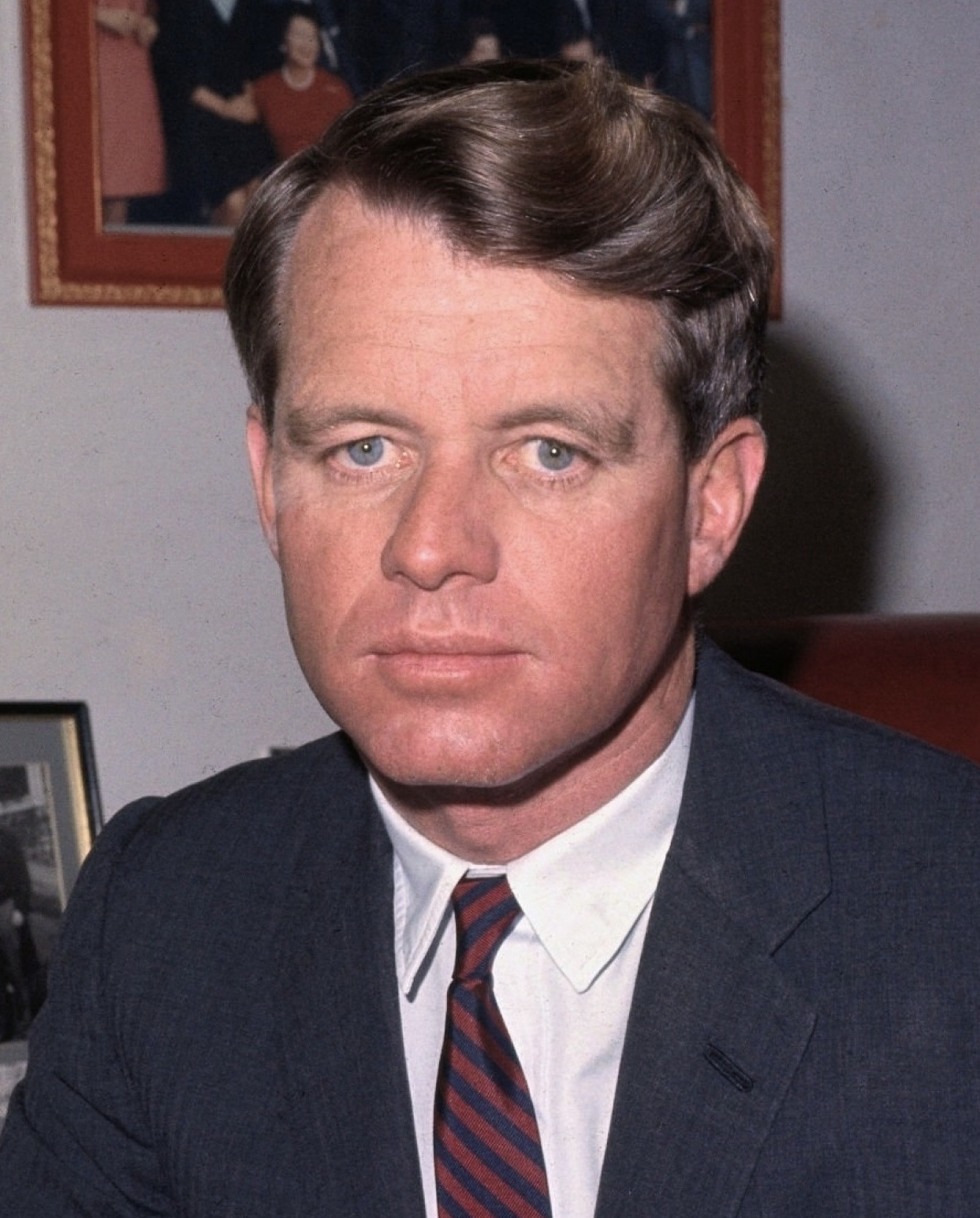
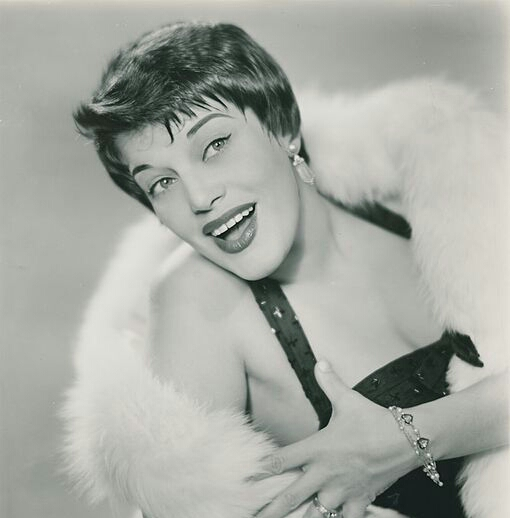
Robert F. Kennedy and Kaye Ballard
- Born:
  - Robert F. Kennedy, American politician who served as U.S. Attorney General and later as a U.S. Senator for New York, before being assassinated while campaigning for the Democratic nomination for U.S. president, member of the Kennedy family; in Brookline, Massachusetts, United States (d. 1968, assassinated)
  - Maya Plisetskaya, Soviet Russian ballerina and choreographer, prima ballerina assoluta of the Bolshoi Ballet during the 1960s; in Moscow, Russian SFSR, Soviet Union (d. 2015)
  - George Barris, builder of custom automobiles, best known for creating the "Batmobile" from a Lincoln Futura concept car; as George Salapatas, in Chicago, United States (d. 2015)
  - Kaye Ballard, American actress, comedian and singer; as Catherine Balotta, in Cleveland, Ohio, United States (d. 2019)
- Died:
  - Alexandra of Denmark, 80, Queen consort of the United Kingdom and the British Dominions from 1901 to 1910 as the wife of King Edward VII, and Queen Mother from 1910 until her death as mother of King George V (b. 1844). She was the daughter of the late King Christian IX of Denmark and the mother of Queen Maud of Norway, wife of King Haakon VII.
  - W. E. Norris, 78, English author who published over 60 novels and hundreds of short stories from 1877 (starting with Heaps of Money) until his death.
  - Clara Morris, 75–79, Canadian-born American stage actress (b. c. 1846–1849)

== November 21, 1925 (Saturday) ==
- The Lava Beds in northern California were placed under federal protection as a U.S. national monument by an act signed into law by U.S. President Calvin Coolidge, after years of lobbying by J. D. Howard. The park surrounding the beds encompasses 46,692 acres or almost 73 square miles or 189 square kilometers.
- A contract was signed between the representatives of six German chemical companies to merge into one corporation, IG Farben. The merger took effect on December 2, just 11 days after the signing of the agreement.
- The Orange Blossom Special, a luxury train operated by the Seaboard Air Line Railroad (SAL) to transport winter-weary travelers from New York City to Miami in Florida, began operations. The first Orange Blossom route used tracks from the Pennsylvania Railroad (from New York to Washington, D.C.), the Richmond, Fredericksburg and Potomac Railroad from Washington to Richmond, Virginia, and the SAL route from Richmond through eaboard Air Line Railroad from Richmond via Raleigh, North Carolina, Columbia, South Carolina, and Savannah, Georgia to Miami. The service would continue until 1953.
- Born: Veljko Kadijević, Serbian general and defense secretary for Yugoslavia from 1988 to 1992, later indicted for war crimes but fled to Russia and was never brought to trial; in Glavina Donja, Kingdom of Serbs, Croats and Slovenes (present-day Croatia) (d. 2014)

== November 22, 1925 (Sunday) ==
- Paul Painlevé resigned as Prime Minister of France when a credit moratorium article in his financial plan was defeated in the Chamber of Deputies by three votes.
- In China, the forces of General Guo Songling began to lay siege to Mukden, the capital of Guo's commander, the warlord Zhang Zuolin.
- Voting took place in Chile for the 132 seats of the Cámara de Diputados and the 45 seats of the Senado. No party won a majority but the Liberal Party won 43 seats in the Cámara, while the Senate was split among six different parties, none of which had more than 14 seats.
- Born:
  - Jerrie Mock, American housewife and amateur pilot who became the first woman to make a solo flight around the world in 1964; as Geraldine Lois Fredritz, in Newark, Ohio, United States (d. 2014)
  - Carla Balenda, American actress; as Sally Bliss, in Carthage, New York, United States (d. 2024)

== November 23, 1925 (Monday) ==
- The most notorious episode in the Kip Rhinelander divorce trial unfolded when Mrs. Rhinelander was taken to the jury room and compelled to partially disrobe in front of the jury to establish that she was indeed "colored" and that Mr. Rhinelander had to have been aware that she was not white.
- Born:
  - Shah Azizur Rahman, Bangladeshi politician who served as the Prime Minister of Bangladesh from 1979 to 1982; in Kushtia, Bengal Presidency, British India (d. 1989)
  - Johnny Mandel, American music composer and winner of five Grammy Awards, known for the melody of "Suicide Is Painless", better recognized as the theme music for the television series M*A*S*H; as John Mandel, in Manhattan, New York City, United States (d. 2020)
  - Maria di Gerlando, American operatic soprano singer and voice teacher; in Luzerne County, Pennsylvania, United States (d. 2010)
  - Tui Flower, New Zealand food writer and author of numerous cookbooks; as Lucy Tui Hampton Flower, in Matamata, New Zealand (d. 2017)

== November 24, 1925 (Tuesday) ==
- The Forrest Theatre, now the Eugene O'Neill Theatre, opened on Broadway.
- The Princess Theatre, now The Regal Theatre, opened near Adelaide in Kensington Park, South Australia.
- Born:
  - William F. Buckley, Jr., American conservative author and commentator; in New York City, United States (d. 2008)
  - Simon van der Meer, Dutch physicist and Nobel Prize laureate; in The Hague, Netherlands (d. 2011)
  - Fernando Casanova, Mexican film star; as Fernando Gutiérrez López, in Guadalajara, Mexico (d. 2012)
  - Richard E. Kraus, U.S. Marine and posthumous Medal of Honor recipient for his heroism by throwing himself on a Japanese grenade in the Battle of Peleliu during World War II; in Chicago, United States (d. 1944, killed in action)
  - Mikhail Khvatkov, Soviet Red Army soldier and posthumous Hero of the Soviet Union recipient for his heroism in rescuing wounded troops during World War II in the Vitebsk–Orsha Offensive; in Gryaznukha, Soviet Union (present-day Russia) (d. 1944, killed in action)

== November 25, 1925 (Wednesday) ==
- The "Hat Law" (Officially "Law No. 671 on Hats") took effect in Turkey, forbidding the wearing of non-Western headgear, particularly the fez.
- In Britain, the League for the Prohibition of Cruel Sports held its organizational meeting, chaired by Ernest Bell and Henry B. Amos with a goal of halting "all sports which involved hunting animals to death", including such as hare coursing, otter hunting, and deer hunting.
- Born:
  - María Asquerino, Spanish film actress, 1989 Goya Award winner for Best Supporting Actress for her role inEl mar y el tiempo (The sea and the time); as Dulce Nombre de María Serrano, in Madrid, Spain (d. 2013)
  - Princess Bejaratana of Thailand, the only child of King Vajiravudh of Siam; as Bejaratana Rajasuda, in Bangkok, Kingdom of Siam (present-day Thailand) (d. 2011)
  - Douglas T. Jacobson, U.S. Marine, Medal of Honor recipient for his heroism at the Battle of Iwo Jima; in Rochester, New York, United States (d. 2000)

== November 26, 1925 (Thursday) ==
- Prajadhipok became the new King of Siam (now Thailand), taking the regnal name of Rama VII, upon the death of his brother, Vajiravudh, who died at the age of 45 at the Grand Palace in Phra Nakhon (now Bangkok). One of his first reforms was to create a cabinet of ministers.
- Italy promulgated a bill bringing secret societies such as Freemasonry under the control of the state and forbidding government employees from belonging to them.
- It was reported that the British government had advised Benito Mussolini not to attend the formal signing of the Locarno Treaties in London, as it could not protect him from being insulted in public. The British public was generally displeased by Mussolini's increasingly authoritarian rule, and labor factions were particularly angered over his suppression of Italian trade unions. Diplomat Vittorio Scialoja would be sent as the Italian representative instead.
- Born:
  - Tazio Secchiaroli, Italian photographer and one of the original paparazzi; Centocelle, Kingdom of Italy (present-day Italy) (d. 1998)
  - Eugene Istomin, American pianist; in New York City, United States (d. 2003)
- Died: Vajiravudh, 45, King of Siam from 1910 until his death, known for popularizing and promoting Thai nationalism; died following complications from surgery for an abdominal abscess (b. 1881)

== November 27, 1925 (Friday) ==
- Gostrudsberkassy, the nationwide savings bank for workers in the Soviet Union, was established by the Central Executive Committee and the Council of People's Commissars. The agency provided for the accumulation of savings from regular withdrawals from workers' pay, and paid interest on the accounts. At the time of its demise following the breakup of the Soviet Union, there would be 80,000 branches of the Gostrudsberkassy.
- The Urtatagai conflict began between the Soviet Union and the Emirate of Afghanistan over control of the island of Urta Tagay, located in the Amu Darya river that served as the border between the two nations.
- A state funeral was held at Westminster Abbey in London for Queen mother Alexandra. The kings of England, Denmark, Norway and Belgium marched behind the casket in the procession.
- Feng Yuxiang sent a public message to Zhang Zuolin telling him to retire or else he would be attacked.
- The jury in the Ossian Sweet trial said it was unable to reach a verdict after 46 hours of deliberation. The judge declared a mistrial and dismissed the jury.
- Miriam Noel Wright, the wife of architect Frank Lloyd Wright, filed for divorce, alleging desertion and cruelty. It had not previously been known to the public that they were married.
- The Reichstag approved the Locarno Treaties.
- Born:
  - Sir John Maddox, Welsh science writer who served as editor of the scientific journal Nature; in Penllergaer, Wales (d. 2009)
  - Ernie Wise, English comedian; as Ernest Wiseman, in Bramley, Leeds, England (d. 1999)
  - Claude Lanzmann, French documentary film maker, known for Shoah (1985); in Bois-Colombes, Hauts-de-Seine département, France (d. 2018)
- Died: James Anderson Slater, 28, British flying ace with 24 aerial victories during World War I; killed in a plane crash along with his co-pilot, W. J. R. Early, when the Sopwith Snipe rainer airplane crashed soon after takeoff (b. 1896)

== November 28, 1925 (Saturday) ==
- The government of French Prime Minister Paul Painlevé resigned after the failure of Finance Minister Joseph Caillaux to reach a settlement with the United States over French wartime loans.
- The first cabinet of members of the Kingdom of Siam was created by decree of King Prajadhipok, who formed the Supreme Council of State. The five-member Supreme Council consisted of the council's president (effectively a prime minister), Prince Bhanurangsi Savangwongse, along with princes Paribatra Sukhumbandhu, Narisara Nuwattiwong, Damrong Rajanubhab and Kitiyakara Voralaksana.
- The Grand Ole Opry made its debut as a radio show, initially as the one-hour program WSM Barn Dance on WSM in Nashville, Tennessee. The first performer, introduced by announcer George Hay, was the fiddler Uncle Jimmy Thompson.
- Canadian ice hockey goaltender and star Georges Vezina, running a fever, collapsed on the ice on the first game of his 16th season for the Montreal Canadiens in the National Hockey League. The next day, he was diagnosed with tuberculosis and retired after 151 league games. He died on March 27, 1926. The NHL would create the Vezina Trophy in his honor, to be awarded to the player who allowed the fewest goals during the regular season, and Vezina would be one of the first people to be inducted to the Hockey Hall of Fame upon its creation in 1945.
- Britain's late Queen mother, Alexandra, was buried in St. George's Chapel, Windsor Castle alongside her late husband in a simple ceremony.
- In American football, the Army–Navy Game was won by the Army, 10 to 3, at the Polo Grounds in New York.

== November 29, 1925 (Sunday) ==
- Elections were held in Uruguay for the 123 seats of the Cámara de Representantes, the lower house of the Asamblea General. While the Partido Nacional won more seats than any other individual party, with 57 altogether, the factions of the ruling Partido Colorado formed a majority of 61.
- The Supreme Council of State of Siam (the Aphiratthamontrisapha), a step back from an absolute monarchy in what is now Thailand, was set up by King Prajadhipok, as a cabinet of five senior princes: his older brothers Kitiyakara Voralaksana, Paribatra Sukhumbandhu and Damrong Rajanubhab, and his younger brothers Narisara Nuwattiwong and Bhanurangsi Savangwongse. Each had a potential claim to the throne and was made the minister of a government department.
- The Banka Kombëtare e Shqipnis, the central bank for Albania, opened its first branch in the Balkan nation, initially with one office at Durrës. The bank had been created on September 2 in Italy and its main office in Rome.
- The new Madison Square Garden, located on Manhattan's Eighth Avenue between 49th and 50th streets, hosted its first event, a six day bicycle race called 'Six Days of New York" that lasted from November 29 until Saturday, December 5. The "American-Italian team" of Reggie McNamara and Franco Giorgetti finished first with 243 points ahead of the "Belgian bearcats", Gerard Debaets and Alfons Goosens.
- The comedy film Clothes Make the Pirate starring Leon Errol and Dorothy Gish was released.
- Born: Ascención Mendieta, Spanish activist and opponent of the Franco regime; in Sacedón, Spain (d. 2019)

== November 30, 1925 (Monday) ==
- The Turkish government outlawed traditional religious institutions, specifically the tekkes zawiyas for Sufi worshipers.
- The Australian seamen's strike ended after fifteen weeks when Melbourne, the last port to hold out, capitulated.
- Religious convents and dervish lodges were closed in Turkey.
- A tropical storm struck near Tampa, Florida, becoming the latest hurricane to ever make landfall in the United States.
- The film Cobra, starring Rudolph Valentino and Nita Naldi, was released.
- Born:
  - Vojtěch Jasný, Czech film director and writer known for Až přijde kocour and Všichni dobří rodáci; in Kelč, Czechoslovakia (present-day Czech Republic) (d. 2019)
  - William H. Gates, Sr., American attorney and father of Bill Gates; as William Gates II, in Bremerton, Washington, United States (d. 2020)
- Died: Yehudah Leib Levin, 80–81, Ukrainian Hebrew language poet who used the pen name Yehalel (b. 1844)
