= Václav Mrázek =

Czech serial killer executed for murders

- Born: 22 October 1925; Svinařov, Czechoslovakia
- Died: 29 December 1957 (aged 32); Pankrác Prison, Prague, Czechoslovakia
- Cause of death: Execution by hanging
- Conviction: Murder x7
- Penalty: Death

Details
- Victims: 7+
- Span of crimes: 1951–1956
- Country: Czechoslovakia
- Date apprehended: 17 March 1957

Signature
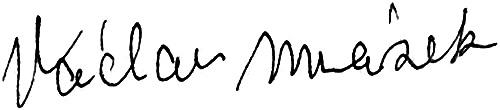

Václav Mrázek (22 October 1925 – 29 December 1957) was a Czech serial killer who was convicted of killing at least seven people in Chomutov from 1951 to 1957. While primarily sexually motivated, he also robbed his victims, and at trial, he was convicted of 127 total crimes. For the murders, Mrázek was hanged at the Pankrác Prison in 1957.

== Early life ==
Mrázek was born on 22 October 1925 in Svinařov as one of 12 children to a poor family, four of whom died young. Due to their circumstances, the family had to sleep in a railroad car at one point. Mrázek only studied until the 5th grade of primary school, and after that, with his parents' knowledge, he and his brother Karel began stealing, mostly food and clothing. Due to his profiency, Mrázek's father forced him to teach his younger siblings as well. For one of these thefts, he was given a conditional sentence in 1941 and served 18 months in prison. After his release, Mrázek longed to become a police officer or soldier, but could not be accepted due to his small stature; because of this, in 1946, he enlisted as an armed escort of a humanitarian convoy to Romania and Bulgaria. However, Mrázek later claimed that the soldiers constantly looted the supplies and distributed them in exchange for sexual services of all kinds, which he witnessed and sometimes directly participated in, and that they also fired at everything alive they saw while on the moving train. Holding a weapon gave a subtle sense of superiority over Mrázek, who is said to have constantly replayed his travel experiences in his mind for his own pleasure, eventually leading to his interest in pornographic literature, which was often sadistic in nature.

Gradually, his sexual desires became more and more unnatural, as at one point he tried to break into a morgue so he could have sex with a corpse. Mrázek admitted that feeling his immobilized victim was the greatest form of excitement, saying that seeing them collapse to the ground after being shot felt even better than the intercourse itself. Nevertheless, he had "normal" relationships, in which his partners described as average and weak-minded, and were often repulsed by his excessive thrifting, stemming from his poor upbringing. At the time of his murders, Mrázek had a long-time partner with whom he had had several children.

== Murders ==
During walks around Chomutov, Mrázek often came across lonely young women, which secretly made him feel a compulsion to sexually assault them. Apparently, his desire was so strong that it gave him an intense headache, and to alleviate it, he decided to act out on his desires. On 22 August 1951, Mrázek came across 15-year-old cow herder Hana Chloubová, who was grazing cows in the forest near Drahonice, whom he killed by beating her to death with a stick. He then dragged the body to a secluded area, where he had sex with it. This murder was not connected to his later crime spree until Václav confessed to it. On 16 September, he fired three shots from his pistol at 32-year-old Bronislava Pajúrková on the road between Jirkov and Kyjice (now a non-existent village east of Jirkov), killing her. Mrázek then dragged the corpse across to the stream, had sex with it, and then dumped it in the water. As the loudness of the shots frightened him, Mrázek opted to use a knife for the next two attacks, but both of his victims survived. In the first case, the knife punctured the girl's jaw; in the second, the girl was stabbed 18 times, but her wounds were shallow. Due to the nature of the wounds, the perpetrator's low stature and thin voice made the investigations believe that the attacker might have been a woman.

On 1 June 1952, Mrázek passed by a local pub, where a dance party was taking place. The view of the dancing girls through the window excited him, so he decided to carry out another attack. Mrázek then stole a bicycle left in front of the pub and started looking for a potential victim. He came across 19-year-old Elena Mermanová, whom he shot at three times. The first bullet pierced her coat's collar and hair, which made the surprised Mermanová duck, causing the second bullet to pierce the back of her coat. While she was on the ground, Mrázek stepped closer and attempted to shoot again, but the last bullet got stuck in the barrel. As he had ejaculated during the shots, Mrázek lost interest in finishing her off and left. On the following morning, Mermanová found bullet holes while examining her coat, dispelling her belief that her attacker was a teenager with a toy gun. She went back to the place where the assault had taken place, noticing what appeared to be drag marks going towards a bush. She followed them, and to her horror, found the body of 16-year-old Marie Dvořácková, who had been killed approximately one hour after Mrázek had attacked Mermanová. On that night, Dvořácková had been left on the road by a friend who had to return home briefly, and so, she went to the Seník settlement to wait for their return. On the way, however, Dvořácková came across Mrázek while he was riding on his bicycle, who promptly killed her with one fatal shot. After killing her, he checked the area to make sure nobody had heard the shot, then returned to the body and dragged it to a nearby field. He then cut off Dvořácková's clothes with a knife, had sex with her body, and after he was done, he covered his head with remnants of Dvořácková's clothes and put on her shoes.

On 14 July 1954, Mrázek killed his fourth victim, 16-year-old student Jiřina Helmichová. On the day of her death, Helmichová had arranged to meet her friend at the forest near Černice, where she was supposed to mow some grass, but arrived late. On her way back home, she passed by Mrázek, who soon after dismounted his bicycle and called out to her. When Helmichová turned to see what he needed, he shot her in the face and then had sex with her body. Following this murder, extensive investigation attempted to capture the killer. On 9 August 1955, while walking along a road between Chomutov and Březenec, Mrázek came across a couple, 19-year-old Libuše Dufková and 26-year-old Karel Trlifaj. Mrázek pulled out his gun and shot Trlifaj thrice, stealing all the valuables from his body and then threw it in a nearby ditch, where he covered it with vegetation. Dufková, who had also been shot at, pretended to be dead, and when she thought the killer had left, she stood up and ran. To her misfortune, Mrázek saw her and shot her in the back, killing Dufková. He then dragged her body to a nearby field, where he had sex with it. Despite intensifying investigations from authorities in Chomutov, the elusive killer continued to avoid capture. As a result, a special task force was set up for the first time in Czechoslovak history. The "Bronislava Task Force", named after the first known victim, investigated around 25,000 suspects, detained several wanted persons and seized a large number of weapons. However, thanks to his inconspicuous behaviour and a full-time job, Mrázek was never considered a suspect, allowing him to change his modus operandi once again.

Mrázek attempted to strangle several women, all of whom survived and called for help. In addition to attempted murders, he also began raping girls as young as six years old, whom he did not kill because he thought it was "useless". After one such attack, he barely eluded capture and probable lynching by angry citizens. He was able to keep track of investigation procedures through acquaintances who worked for the police, as well as his subordinates at the workplace. Fearing capture, he decided to switch jobs and leave for Kladno. Due to an official's mistake, his name was excluded from people who should be questioned about the killings.

On 9 November 1956, Mrázek broke into the house of his acquaintance Ladislav Beran, from whom he decided to steal as he had heard rumours that the family had a considerable sum of money. Assuming that Beran had a night shift and was out of the house, he broke into the house, but immediately came across Beran's 57-year-old wife Alžběta, who recognized Mrázek and shouted out his name. Mrázek then killed her with an axe he had picked up in the yard, which he had only planned to use for burglary. After killing Alžběta, he forced her 11-year-old daughter Jarmilla to help him find money and valuables. Once they were done, he raped the girl before leaving the house. The daughter was unable to identify her assailant, as he had covered his face with a handkerchief.

== Arrest, trial and execution ==
Mrázek remained unapprehended until 17 March 1957, when he was caught after a police inspection of his home. This was preceded by him being reported for a theft at a mine in Libušín, where he worked as a spa staff attendant. One of the miners, who had injured his hand, had caught Mrázek rifling through his clothes in the locker room. As many similar thefts had been reported to the police, Mrázek was arrested and his house searched. During the search, authorities discovered a hair clipper which had been stolen from the Beran crime scene. As they continued, police also found a Walther PP hidden in a hollow leg of a table in the cellar, whose bullets matched those used in the Chomutov murders. Investigators later expressed their shock that virtually the entire apartment was stocked with stolen items, some of which were of no meaningful use to him.

Mrázek initially admitted to a few thefts, and refused to confide any information to his cellmate, who was secretly an informant. It was only after he learned of the results of the ballistic expertise that he broke down crying and confessed to all the murders and numerous other crimes. He was mentally conscious of the harm his actions caused. While committing crimes he behaved in a very organized manner, as evidenced by his ability to evade justice for a long time. One peculiar claim made by him was that he hated the sight of blood.

At one point, Mrázek was considered a suspect in three murders committed in North Bohemia in 1951 (nicknamed "Operation Erika", after one of the victims), but he claimed no responsibility for them and was eventually eliminated as a suspect in two of them. Mrázek was speedily convicted for 7 murders, 4 attempted murders and 14 rapes, which came as a surprise to him, as he thought that there was no death penalty and expected a maximum sentence of 10 years. On 29 December 1957, Václav Mrázek was hanged at the Pankrác Prison. On the same day, a death mask was made and an autopsy was performed on his body. The following day, his remains were cremated at the Motol Crematorium. For his participation in some of the thefts, Karel Mrázek was sentenced to 12 years.

== In media and film ==
The case loosely inspired Petr Schulhoff's 1966 film Vrah skrývá tvář ('The Murderer Hides a Face').

Mrázek's case is covered in the first part of the crime documentary Hrdelní zločiny in 2001.

== See also ==
- List of serial killers by country
