= Svinařov =

- Municipality
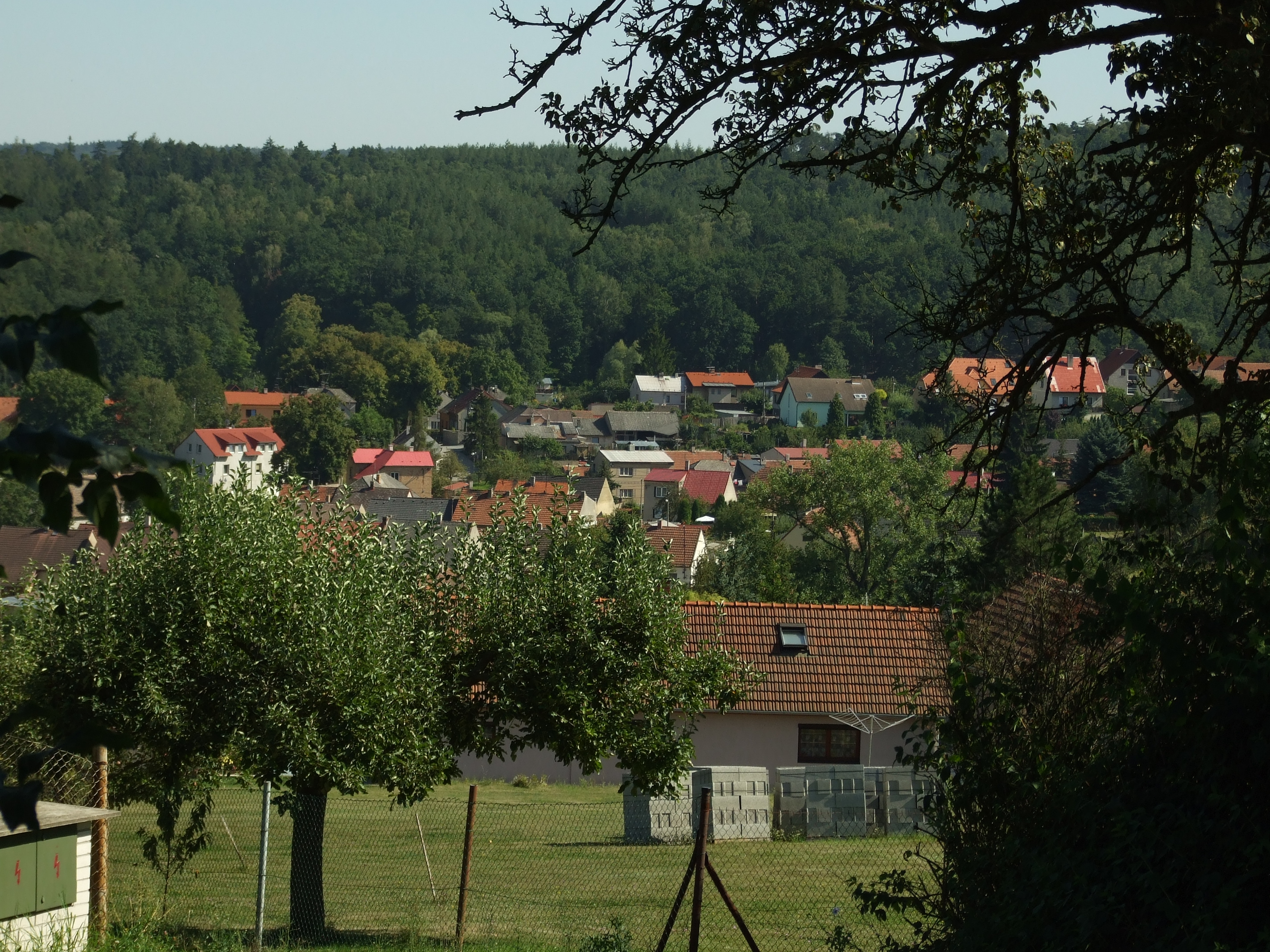
- View towards Svinařov

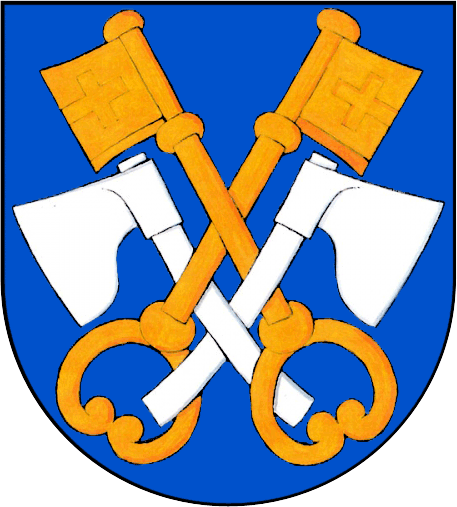
- Flag Coat of arms

- Location in the Czech Republic
- Coordinates: 50°10′53″N 14°3′1″E
- Country: Czech Republic
- Region: Central Bohemian
- District: Kladno
- First mentioned: 1325

Area
  - Total: 1.93 km^{2} (0.75 sq mi)
- Elevation: 300 m (980 ft)

Population (2026-01-01)
  - Total: 725
  - Density: 376/km^{2} (973/sq mi)
- Time zone: UTC+1 (CET)
  - Summer (DST): UTC+2 (CEST)
- Postal code: 273 05
- Website: www.svinarov.cz

Svinařov is a municipality and village in Kladno District in the Central Bohemian Region of the Czech Republic. It has about 700 inhabitants.

== Etymology ==
The name was most likely derived from cattle breeding (from svině = 'swine') or wine growing (from víno = 'wine') for the needs of the nearby gord of Libušín.

== Geography ==
Svinařov is located about 5 kilometres (3 mi) northwest of Kladno and 23 km (14 mi) northwest of Prague. The eastern part of the municipal territory lies in the Prague Plateau and the western part lies in the Džbán range. The highest point is at 392 m (1,286 ft) above sea level. The stream Svinařovský potok flows through the municipality.

== History ==
The first written mention of Svinařov is from 1328, when the village was sold by Bořita of Ředhošt to the Vyšehrad Chapter. It is probable that there was some kind of settlement much earlier thanks to an archaeological research carried out in a nearby town of Libušín which proved that the area was inhabited in the 6th–7th centuries. The existence of Svinařov was closely connected with the gord of Libušín. Svinařov served as a supplier of agricultural products to the gord.

There was a fortress built around 1330. The owner of Svinařov, Vyšehrad Chapter, used to hire out the Svinařov to different tenants till the reign of Wenceslaus IV of Bohemia, when the village was sold. Some years later it became a part of property of the Martinic family and was annexed to their Smečno estate, which remained so until the 19th century. The family of Martinic gradually became one of the richest and most powerful noble families in the Czech kingdom. In 1885, Svinařov village separated from Libušín and became an independent municipality.

Most people there earned their living in agriculture, but this changed in the second half of the 19th century with the discovery of coal in the region. Many people from all around the country started to move in and the village started to expand. Most people were therefore employed in the coal industry until the mines closed down in 2002.

== Demographics ==
Historical population

Year	Pop.	±%
1869	250	—
1880	319	+27.6%
1890	671	+110.3%
1900	1,025	+52.8%
1910	1,278	+24.7%

Year	Pop.	±%
1921	1,266	−0.9%
1930	1,168	−7.7%
1950	783	−33.0%
1961	822	+5.0%
1970	646	−21.4%

Year	Pop.	±%
1980	581	−10.1%
1991	574	−1.2%
2001	614	+7.0%
2011	715	+16.4%
2021	724	+1.3%

Source: Censuses

== Transport ==
There are no railways or major roads passing through the municipality.

== Sights ==
There are no protected cultural monuments in the municipality.

== Notable people ==
- Václav Mrázek (1925–1957), serial killer
