= Zdeněk Herman =

Czech physical chemist (1934–2021)

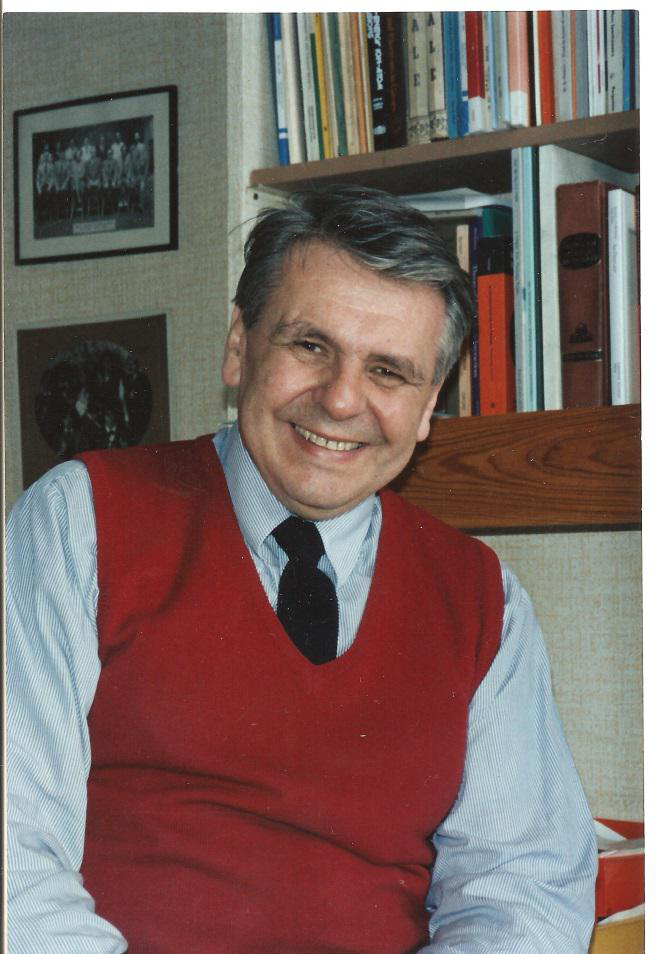

Zdeněk Herman (24 March 1934 – 25 February 2021) was a Czech physical chemist.

== Life and work ==
Herman was born on 24 March 1934 in Libušín. He studied physical chemistry and radiochemistry at the School of Mathematics and Physics of Charles University, Prague (1952–1957). He then joined the Institute of Physical Chemistry of the Czech Academy of Sciences, to which he remained affiliated.

Herman's early work, with Vladimír Čermák concerned mass spectrometric studies of the kinetics of collision and ionization processes of ions (chemical reaction of ions, Penning and associative ionization). During his post-doctoral years (1964–1965), with Richard Wolfgang at Yale University, Herman built one of the first crossed beam machines to study ion-molecule processes.

Herman also built an improved crossed beam machine that was used in Prague with colleagues to investigate the dynamics of ion-molecule and charge transfer reactions of cations and dications, and ion-surface collisions by the scattering method (1970–2010).

Herman has published over 240 scientific articles in this field.

== Awards ==
Herman's academic awards include the Ian Marcus Marci Medal (Czech Spectroscopic Society, 1989), the Alexander von Humboldt Research Prize (awarded in Germany in 1992, the first time the prize was awarded to a Czech natural scientist), the Česká hlava ("Czech Head") National Prize for lifetime achievements (2003), an Honorary Degree from the Leopold-Franzens University in Innsbruck (2007), and honorary membership of the Czech Mass Spectrometric Society.

Special honorary issues of The Journal of Physical Chemistry (1995) and The International Journal of Mass Spectrometry (2009) were issued to celebrate his 60th and 75th birthdays respectively. Since 2014 the Resonance Foundation awards "The Zdeněk Herman Prize" for the best PhD thesis in chemical physics and mass spectrometry. Since 2016 the international conference MOLEC (Dynamics of Molecular Systems) awards the "Zdeněk Herman Young Scientist Prize".

In his free time, Herman painted and sculpted, and has exhibited his work on several occasions. Busts by Herman of founders of several institutes of the Academy of Sciences are on display at those institutes. Three statues sculpted by Herman stand in the countryside around Rakovník (e.g., in the park in Pavlíkov).
