= Gryaznukha =

Gryaznukha Грязнуха
- Village
- Location within Perm Krai Location within Russia
- Coordinates: 58°49′N 56°47′E
- Country: Russia
- Region: Perm Krai
- District: Dobryansky District
- Time zone: UTC+5:00

Gryaznukha (Russian: Грязнуха) is a rural locality (a village) in Dobryansky District, Perm Krai, Russia. The population was 16 as of 2010.

== Geography ==
Gryaznukha is located 59 km northeast of Dobryanka (the district's administrative centre) by road. Omelichi is the nearest rural locality.
