= Libušín =

- Town
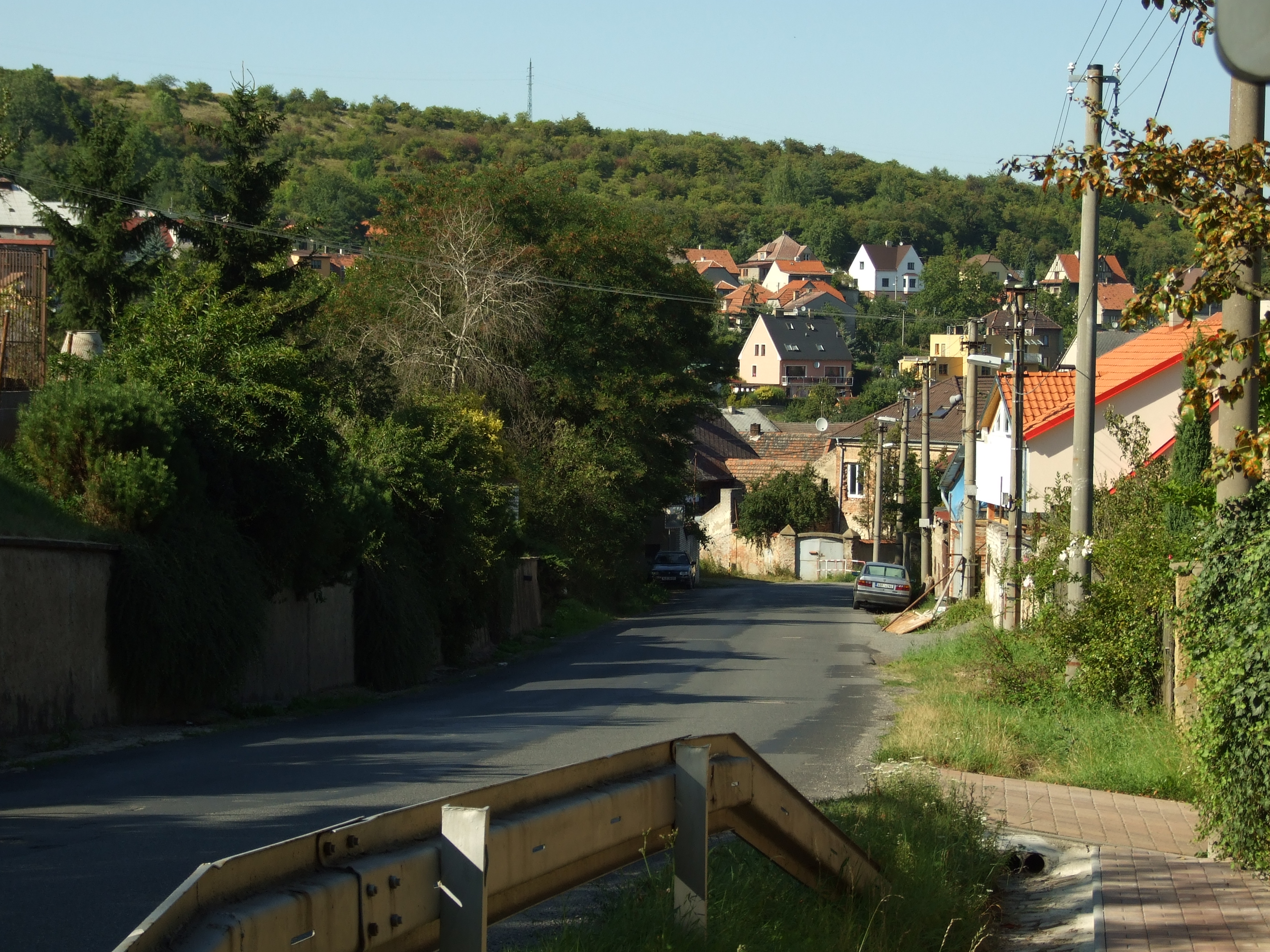
- View of Libušín

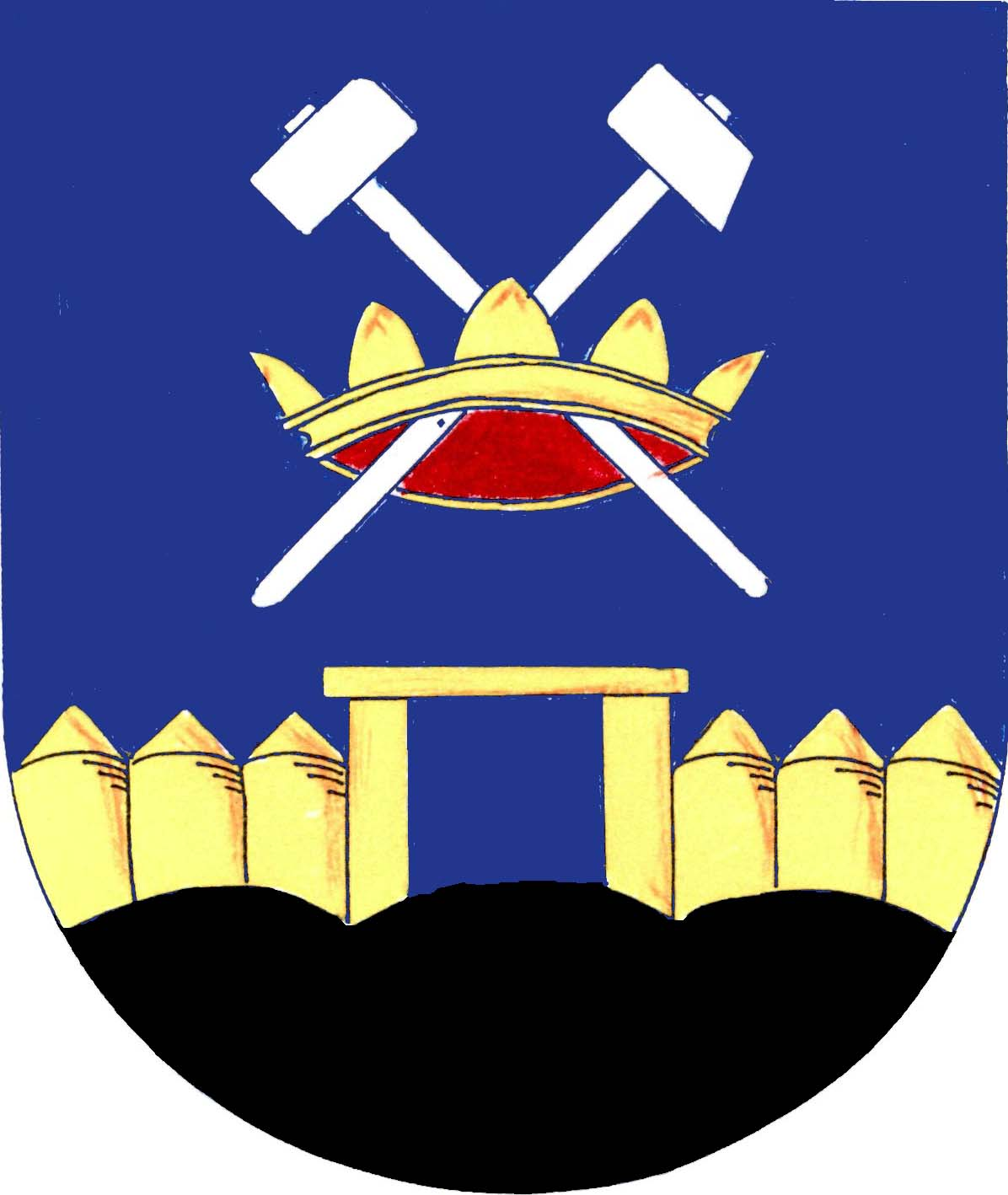
- Flag Coat of arms

- Location in the Czech Republic
- Coordinates: 50°10′6″N 14°3′17″E
- Country: Czech Republic
- Region: Central Bohemian
- District: Kladno
- First mentioned: 1052

Government
  - Mayor: Vladimír Eichler

Area
  - Total: 9.48 km^{2} (3.66 sq mi)
- Elevation: 317 m (1,040 ft)

Population (2026-01-01)
  - Total: 3,534
  - Density: 373/km^{2} (966/sq mi)
- Time zone: UTC+1 (CET)
  - Summer (DST): UTC+2 (CEST)
- Postal code: 273 06
- Website: www.mestolibusin.cz

Libušín (Czech pronunciation: [ˈlɪbuʃiːn]) is a town in Kladno District in the Central Bohemian Region of the Czech Republic. It has about 3,500 inhabitants. The town proper is located in the Prague Plateau. In 1885–2002, bituminous coal was mined in Libušín, thanks to which the municipality grew and in 1919 it was promoted to a town.

== Etymology ==
The oldest entry of the name of the village was Ľubošín. The name was derived from the personal name Ľuboša, meaning "Ľuboša's (property)".

== Geography ==
Libušín is located about 4 kilometres (2 mi) northwest of Kladno and 20 km (12 mi) northwest of Prague. Almost the entire municipal territory lies in the Prague Plateau, only a small part in the west extends into the Džbán range. The highest point is at 424 m (1,391 ft) above sea level.

== History ==
According to archaeological finds, there was a Slavic settlement already in the 6th–7th century. At the end of the 9th century, a gord was built here. The first written mention of Libušín is from 1052. In 1277, it was donated to the Ostrov Monastery in Davle by King Ottokar II. In 1514, the Martinic family bought Libušín and owned it until the 20th century.

In 1775, bituminous coal was found near Libušín. The coal mining in the municipal territory started in 1885, when the first of three mines in Libušín was opened. The coal mining increased the town's population and accelerated its development. The coal was mined here until 2002.

In 1919, Libušín became a town, but it lost the town status for the period 1961–2006.

== Demographics ==
Historical population

Year	Pop.	±%
1869	501	—
1880	855	+70.7%
1890	2,339	+173.6%
1900	4,087	+74.7%
1910	4,682	+14.6%

Year	Pop.	±%
1921	4,146	−11.4%
1930	4,106	−1.0%
1950	4,025	−2.0%
1961	3,574	−11.2%
1970	3,015	−15.6%

Year	Pop.	±%
1980	2,585	−14.3%
1991	2,330	−9.9%
2001	2,463	+5.7%
2011	2,878	+16.8%
2021	3,137	+9.0%

Source: Censuses

== Transport ==
There are no railways or major roads passing through the municipality (except for the disused railway from the former coal mines).

== Culture ==
Libušín is known for its annual huge medieval festival with the biggest medieval historical reenactment in the country and one of the biggest in Europe. It was established in 1991. The battle is fictional and not based on a historical event.

== Sights ==
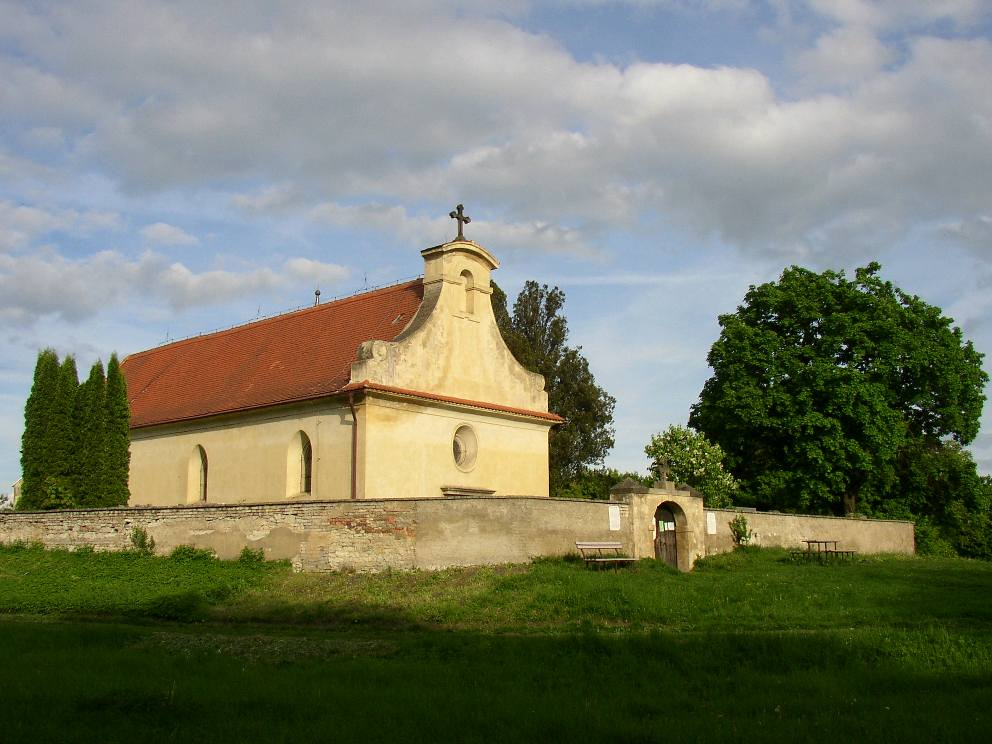
Church of Saint George

The Church of Saint George was probably founded in the 10th century in the gord's area. In 1650, the church took its current Baroque shape. Its location away from the town centre was the reason why another church was built in 1908 – the neo-Gothic Church of Saint Procopius.

The area of Church of Saint George and remains of the gord include a wooden bell tower built in 1500.

The mining tower together with the mining building were inscribed on the list of technical cultural monuments.

== Notable people ==
- Jiří Pauer (1919–2007), composer
- Josef Frolík (1928–1989), CIA spy
- Zdeněk Herman (1934–2021), physical chemist
