= April 1925 =

Month of 1925

<<	April 1925					>>
Su	Mo	Tu	We	Th	Fr	Sa
			1	2	3	4
5	6	7	8	9	10	11
12	13	14	15	16	17	18
19	20	21	22	23	24	25
26	27	28	29	30

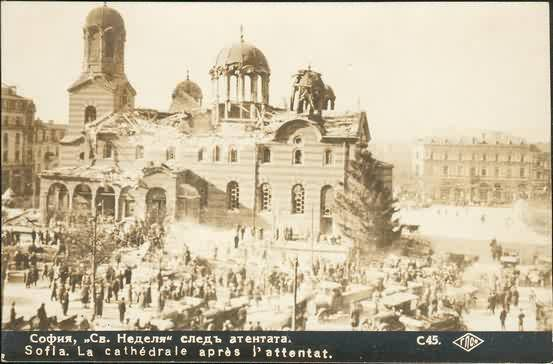
April 16, 1925: Terrorist bombing of St. Nedelya Church in Bulgaria kills 213 people.

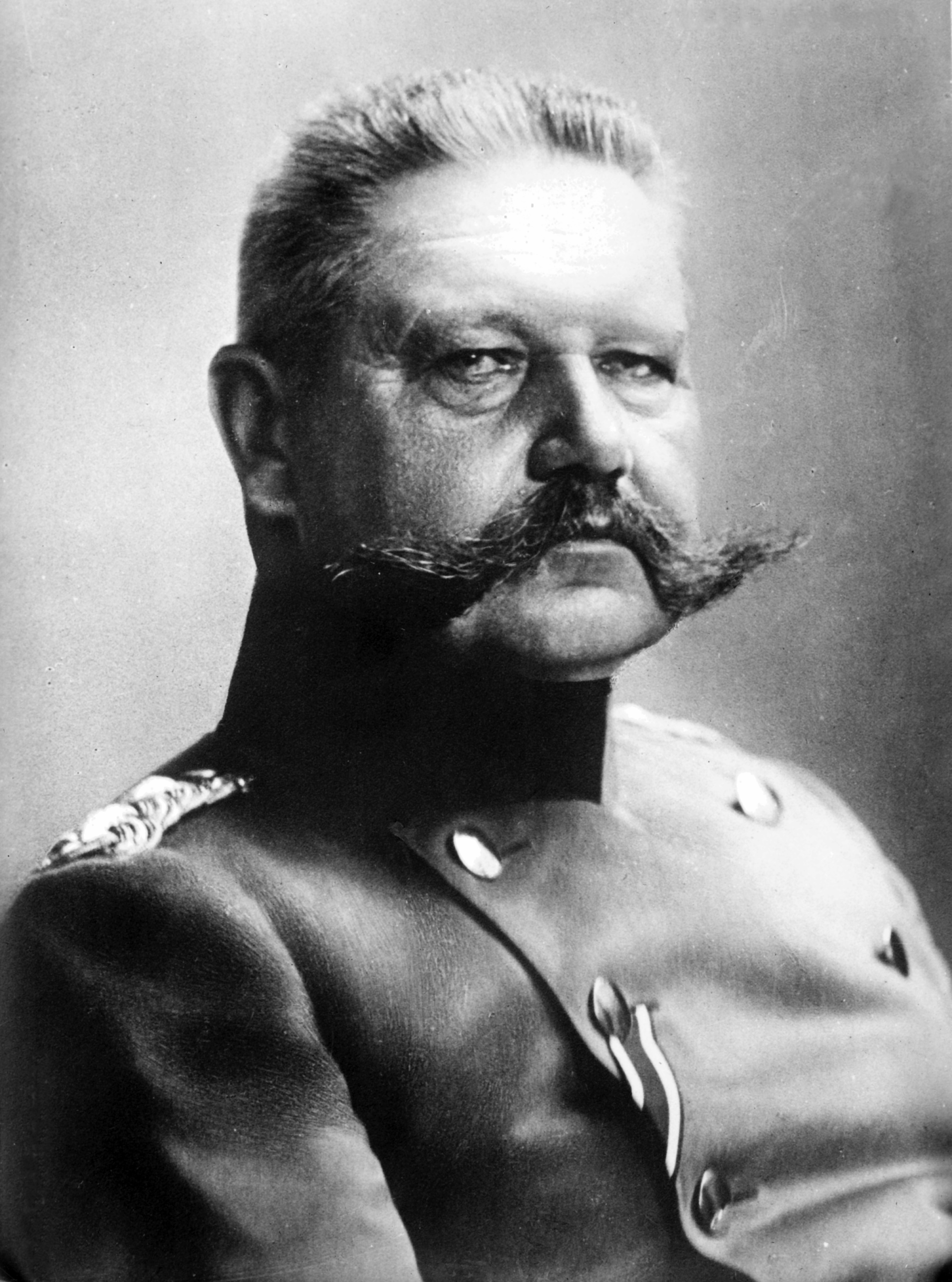
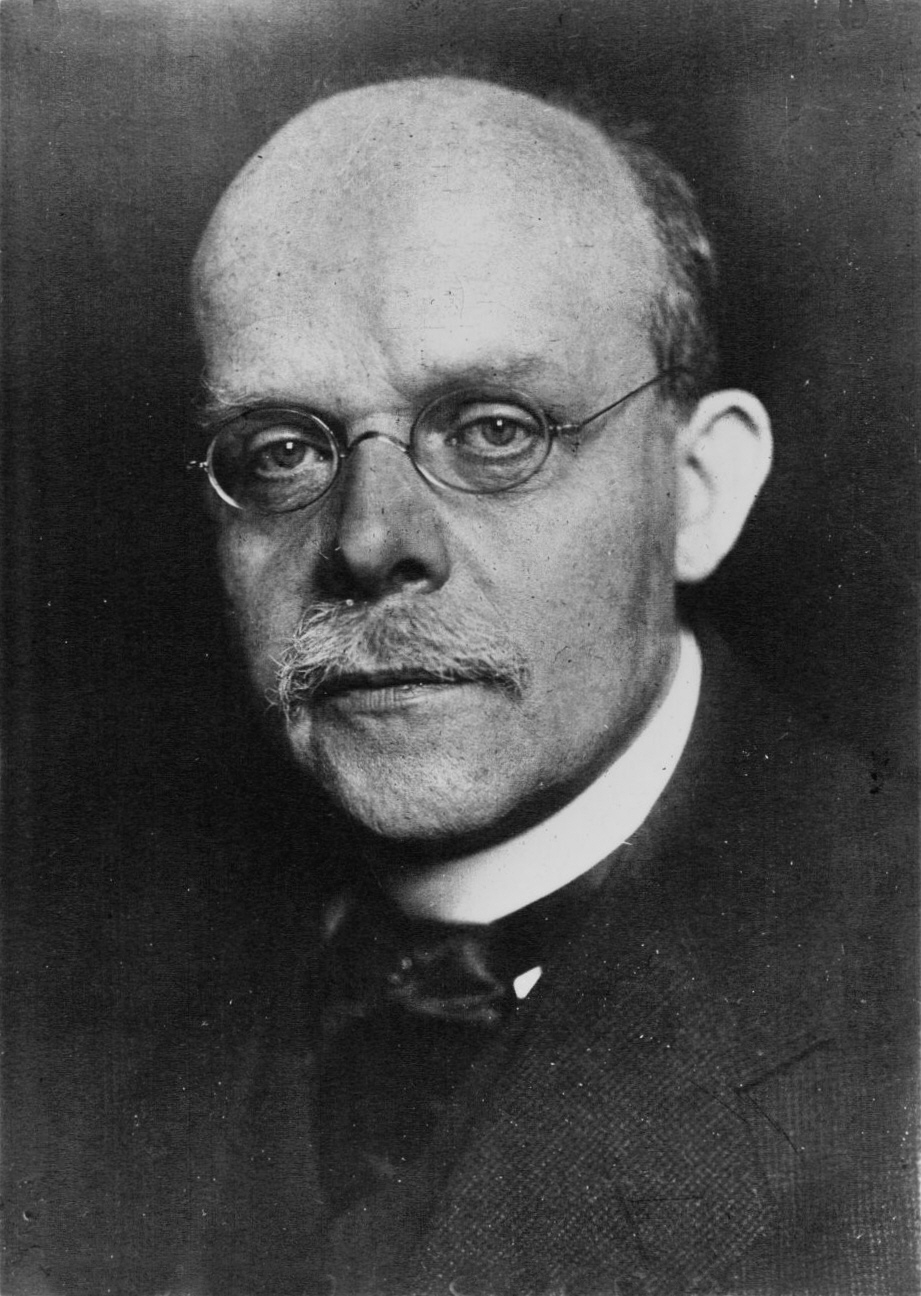
April 26, 1925: Paul von Hindenburg defeats Wilhelm Marx in German presidential runoff election.

The following events occurred in April 1925:

== April 1, 1925 (Wednesday) ==
- The Hebrew University of Jerusalem opened at a gala ceremony attended by the leaders of the Jewish world, distinguished scholars and public figures, and British dignitaries, including the Earl of Balfour, Viscount Allenby, Winston Churchill and Sir Herbert Samuel.
- Yeta III, King of Barotseland and the Lozi people in what is now Zambia, abolishes the corvee, the last vestige of slavery in the British colony of Northern Rhodesia.
- Radioordningen, the oldest and largest radio, television and electronic media company in Denmark, was established. The publicly funded company would be renamed Statsradiofonien in 1926 and Danmarks Radio in 1959, and is now known as "DR".
- Anadolu Sigorta (Anatolian Security), the first national insurance company of Turkey, was established.
- Mike Ballerino became the new World Junior Lightweight Boxing Champion by defeating title holder Steve Sullivan in a unanimous decision at a 15-round bout in Philadelphia.
- Born: Ernest Kinoy, American playwright and screenwriter; in New York City, United States (d. 2014)

== April 2, 1925 (Thursday) ==
- France and Turkey agreed on the autonomy of Alexandretta.
- The Police Forces Amalgamation Act 1925 went into effect in the Republic of Ireland, after having been passed on February 27, 1922, consolidating the Garda Síochána and the Dublin Metropolitan Police into a single national police force.
- American bank robber Harry Pierpont, who had led a gang in the hold-ups of six banks in Indiana and Michigan since November 26, was arrested in a Detroit apartment, along with his accomplice Ted Skeer and Skeer's girlfriend Louise Brunner. In 1933, Pierpont would escape from prison and joing John Dillinger on a new string of bank robberies, Recaptured several months later, he would be executed on October 17, 1934.

The first Oklahoma flag

the second Oklahoma flag

- A new flag was adopted for the U.S. state of Oklahoma, replacing the red flag (with a single star and the number 46 for the 46th state) that had been in use since 1911. The flag was designed by Louise Fluke, winner of a contest sponsored by the state's Daughters of the American Revolution. The only change to the flag in its first 100 years was the addition, in 1941, of the word "OKLAHOMA" on the banner.
- Born:
  - Saqi, Iraqi-born Pakistani film and television actor who appeared in more than 500 films between 1955 and 1986; as Abdul Latif Baloch, in Baghdad, Iraq (d. 1986)
  - Hard Boiled Haggerty, American professional wrestler, professional football player, and actor; as Don Stansauk, in Los Angeles, United States (d. 2004)
- Died:
  - C. E. Humphry, 81, Irish-born British feminist, journalist and columnist who went by the byline "Madge" (b. 1843)
  - Baroness Fanny Moser, 76, Swiss noblewoman and heiress, profiled as "Emmy von N." in Sigmund Freud's 1895 book Studies on Hysteria (b. 1848)

== April 3, 1925 (Friday) ==
- The Ulster Unionist Party, led by Northern Irish Prime Minister Craigavon, won 32 of the 52 the seats in voting for the Parliament of Northern Ireland.
- The British government repealed the Reparation Recovery Act, which had placed import duties on German goods as a means of recovering reparations payments.
- Henry Ford opened offices for Ford Air Transport Service, soliciting contracts for a private air freight service between Detroit and Chicago, with the first flight departing ten days later on April 13.
- Born: Tony Benn, British politician, served as the Secretary of State for Industry from 1974 to 1975 and Secretary of State for Energy from 1975 to 1979; as Anthony Benn, in Westminster, London, England (d. 2014)

== April 4, 1925 (Saturday) ==
- Retired 77-year-old Field Marshal Paul von Hindenburg agreed to run in the second round of the German presidential election in the place of Karl Jarres, who had won the first round.
- By a margin of 65% to 35%, voters overwhelmingly rejected a proposal to ban the sale of beer and liquor in the Australian state of Western Australia.
- Born: Fariza Magomadova, Chechen education pioneer; in Chechen Autonomous Oblast, Soviet Union (present-day Chechnya, Russia) (alive in 2026)

== April 5, 1925 (Sunday) ==
- Voting was held in Belgium for the 187 seats in the Chamber of Representatives and the 93 seats in the Belgian Senate. The Catholic Party and the Belgian Labour Party each won 78 seats in the Chamber and formed a coalition government headed by Aloys Van de Vyvere of the Catholic Party. In the Senate, the Catholic Party won 34 seats and the Labour Party won 33.
- An F3 tornado struck Dade County, Florida and caused $300,000 of damage, equivalent to more than five million dollars in 2025.
- The Swedish Bandy Association (Svenska bandyförbundet) was formed.

== April 6, 1925 (Monday) ==
- A flight billed as showing the first "in-flight movie" was conducted by Imperial Airways from London to Paris, showing The Lost World. Subsequent research has established that this was actually not the first, as the earliest known in-flight movie has been dated to 1921.
- Investigative reporter Robert St. John was severely beaten by several of Al Capone's men after writing a series of exposés about Capone's criminal operations in the Chicago suburb of Cicero, Illinois.
- Died: Alexandria "Xie" Kitchin, 60, British photographic model for Lewis Carroll from the age of 4 until she was 15 (b. 1864)

== April 7, 1925 (Tuesday) ==
- Adolf Hitler formally renounced his Austrian citizenship, appearing before the High Magistrate in the city of Linz, and wrote that "I have been in Germany singe 1912, served in the German army for almost 6 years, including 4½ years at the front, and now intend to acquire German citizenship. For almost seven years, he would be stateless and unable to run for public office, until being granted German citizenship on February 26, 1932.
- France's Chamber of Deputies voted, 389 to 140, to grant women the right to vote, something the Deputies had done in 1919. As in 1919, however, the French Senate refused to put the matter to a vote. Other attempts would fail in 1927, 1932, 1935 and 1936 before an action by General Charles de Gaulle in 1944 to decree women's suffrage.
- Born: Chaturanan Mishra, Indian Communist politician, served as the Secretary of Agriculture from 1996 to 1998; in Nahar, Bihar and Orissa Province, British India (present-day Bihar, India) (d. 2011)
- Died: Patriarch Tikhon of Moscow, 60, Patriarch of Moscow and all Rus' since 1925, later canonized in 1981 as a saint of the Russian Orthodox Church (b. 1865)

== April 8, 1925 (Wednesday) ==
- The Australian government and British Colonial Office announced a joint plan to encourage 450,000 British citizens to move to Australia by offering low-interest loans and skills training, in accordance with the Empire Settlement Act 1922.
- A group of airmen, including John D. Price, made the first planned night landing on a U.S. aircraft carrier when he landed his TS fighter biplane on the USS Langley, which was anchored off of North Island on the coast of California in the U.S.
- Died:
  - Frank Stephen Baldwin, 86, American inventor known for the 1874 creation of the "arithmometer", the first popular adding machine, and the 1901 creation of the improved mechanical Monroe Adding-Calculator (b. 1838)
  - Abbie Carrington, 68, American coloratura soprano opera singer during the 19th century (b. 1856)

== April 9, 1925 (Thursday) ==
- The Trustee Act 1925, officially "An Act to consolidate certain enactments relating to trustees in England and Wales", was given royal assent by King George V, to take effect on January 1, 1926.
- Two people were killed and 11 wounded in Damascus when a demonstration against Lord Balfour near the hotel where he was staying turned into a violent confrontation with police. Arabs resented Balfour's promotion of Jewish interests in Palestine.
- Born:
  - Linda Goodman, American astrologer and author of the bestsellers Sun Signs (1968) and Linda Goodman's Love Signs (1978); as Mary Alice Kemery, in Morgantown, West Virginia, United States (d. 1995)
  - Frank J. Shakespeare, American television executive and diplomat; in New York City, United States (d. 2022)
  - Virginia Gibson, American dancer, singer and actress; as Virginia Gorski, in St. Louis, United States (d. 2013)
  - Heinz Nixdorf, German computing pioneer and founder (in 1952) of Nixdorf Computer AG; in Paderborn, Province of Westphalia, Germany (d. 1986)

== April 10, 1925 (Friday) ==
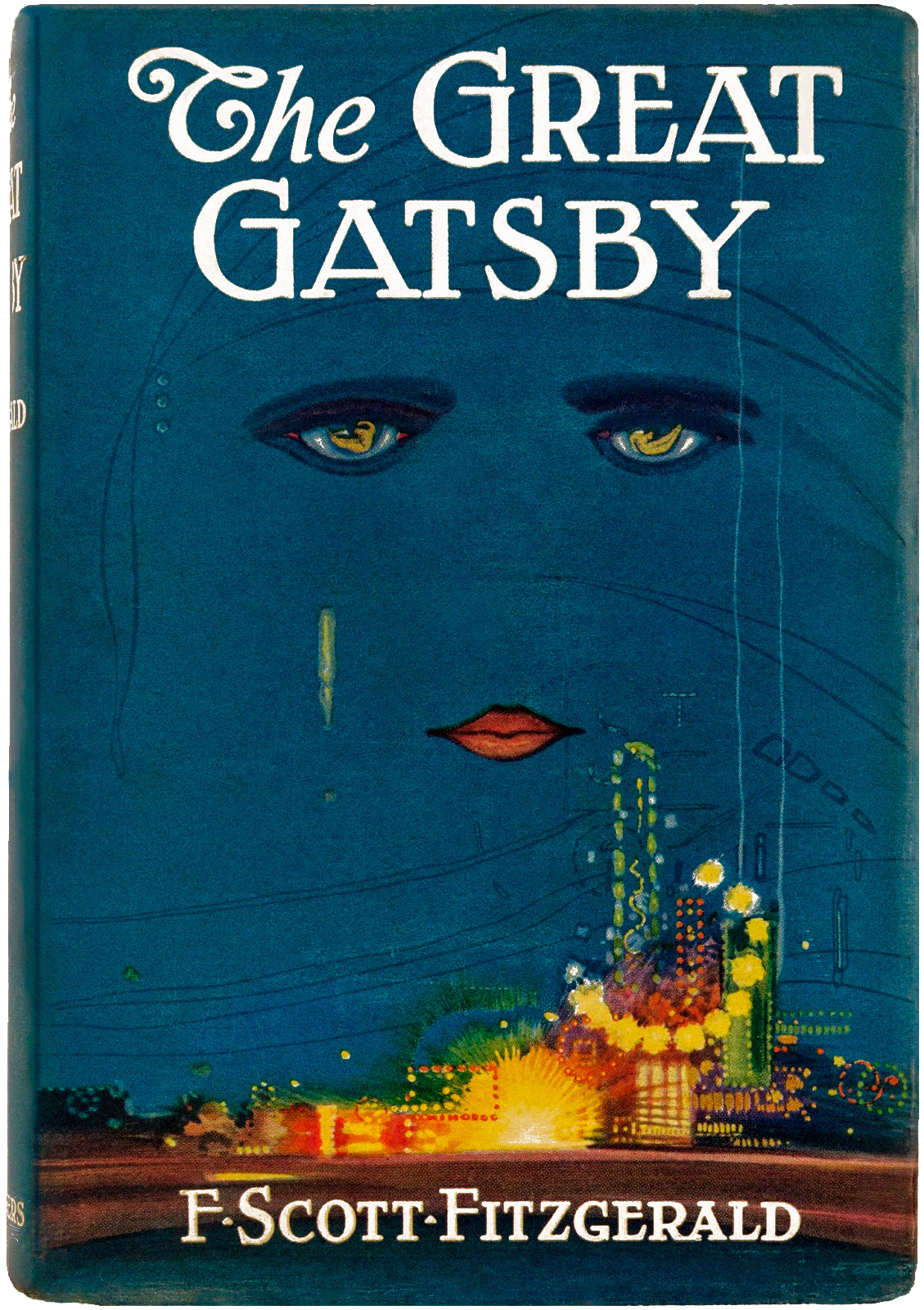
Front cover of the first edition of The Great Gatsby

- The novel The Great Gatsby by F. Scott Fitzgerald was first published by Charles Scribner's Sons.
- The Russian city of Tsaritsyn was renamed Stalingrad to honor the Soviet leader Joseph Stalin, Soviet Communist Party General Secretary, who had guided the defense of Tsaritsyn during the Russian Civil War in 1920. On November 10, 1961, as part of the Soviet program of "de-Stalinization" and the dismantling of Stalin's personality cult, the city would be given its present name, Volgograd.
- French Prime Minister Édouard Herriot and his cabinet announced their resignations after losing a vote of confidence in the French Senate, with 156 against him and only 132 favoring him.
- The U.S. Forest Service established Dix National Forest in New Jersey, Eustis, Humphreys and Lee National Forests in Virginia, Meade National Forest in Maryland, Upton National Forest in New York and Tobyhanna National Forest in Pennsylvania on the same day, for a total of 98.46 square miles (255.0 km^{2}) of new federally protected territory.
- On the morning of Good Friday, police in Denver, Colorado, carried out a raid at the direction of Mayor Benjamin F. Stapleton, that led to the arrest of over 200 bootleggers, prostitutes, and gamblers in the city. Although Stapleton was a member of the Ku Klux Klan, whose members had benefited from the illegal institutions, and although the Klan had supported the campaign of Stapleton and of members of the Denver City Council, Stapleton declared his independence from the organization. The Klan would strip Stapleton of his KKK membership three months later.
- Lord Balfour hastily left Damascus as Arab protests against him continued.
- Born:
  - Kharis Suhud, Indonesian general and politician, served as the Chairman of the Indonesian Armed Forces from 1971 to 1974, and as th Speaker of the People's Consultative Assembly from 1987 to 1992; as Mohammad Kharis Suhud, in Madiun, East Java, Indonesia (d. 2012)
  - Major Charles L. Kelly, American U.S. Army helicopter pilot and medical evacuation specialist, nicknamed "Dustoff" for his daring flights into combat zones; in Wadley, Georgia, United States (d. 1964, killed in action)
  - Mongush Kenin-Lopsan, Russian Tuvan writer and researcher in Tuvan shamanism; in Kyzyl, Tannu Tuva, Soviet Union (present-day Tuva, Russia) (d. 2022)
  - Angelo Poffo, American professional wrestler; in Downer's Grove, Illinois, United States (d. 2010)
- Died:
  - General Hu Jingyi, 32, Chinese warlord and Military Governor of Henan Province from 1924 until his death (b. 1892)
  - Leslie C. Brand, 65, American real estate developer who created Glendale, California (b. 1859)

== April 11, 1925 (Saturday) ==
- The James Simpson-Roosevelt Asiatic Expedition, sponsored by the Field Museum of Natural History and organized by Kermit Roosevelt and his brother Theodore Roosevelt Jr., departed from New York City on April 11, 1925, aboard SS Leviathan for the purpose of collecting wildlife specimens from mountainous regions in Asia, particularly in the Pamir Mountains and the Tian Shan Mountains. It would return with over 2,000 specimens of small mammals, birds and reptiles, and 70 large mammals, including the Marco Polo sheep.
- Celtic F.C. defeated Dundee, 2 to 1 before a crowd of 75,317 at Hampden Park in Glasgow, to win the Scottish Cup of soccer football. In the 81st minute, Peter Wilson passed to Patsy Gallacher of Celtic was tackled and fell, but he gripped the ball in between his feet and somersaulted into the goal, tangling himself in the goalnet in the process, but scoring the winning point. In the regular season, Celtic had finished in fourth place behind Rangers (whom they beat, 5 to 0 in the semi-finals), Airderonians and Hibernian while Dundee had finished in eighth place.
- Born:
  - Viola Liuzzo, white American civil rights activist known for being murdered by the Ku Klux Klan while bringing participants to the Selma to Montgomery marches; as Viola Fauver Gregg, in California, Pennsylvania, United States (d. 1965)
  - George Shuffler, American bluegrass guitar player and inductee to the International Bluegrass Music Hall of Fame; in Valdese, North Carolina, United States (d. 2014)
- Died: William Edgar Geil, 59, American explorer, photographer, and travel writer known for being the first American to have traveled the entire length of the 1,500 miles (2,400 km) Ming section of the Great Wall of China for his books and photographs; died of influenza (b. 1865)

== April 12, 1925 (Sunday) ==
- The Metropolitan Peter of Krutitsy (Pyotr Fyodorovich Polyansky) was installed as the new Patriarch of Moscow and leader of the Russian Orthodox Church, on the same day as the funeral for his predecessor, Patriarch Tikhon of Moscow. Tikhon's funeral in Moscow was the last major public Russian Orthodox Church event and the last major religious event in the Soviet Union for over 60 years. Peter, identified in Tikhon's will as one of three potential successors, was selected by the council of 59 bishops because "the first two were already in prison."
- Following the example set by the United Kingdom on March 3, France agreed that its share of indemnities still owed by China for the Boxer Rebellion should go instead to railway construction in that nation.
- Club Bolívar, one of the most successful soccer football teams in the South American nation of Bolivia, was founded in La Paz.

== April 13, 1925 (Monday) ==
- Abd el-Krim of the Riffians led an attack on French forces in Morocco marking a renewed intensification of the Rif War.
- The Dominion of Newfoundland granted women the right to vote.
- The first American cargo airline, the Ford Air Transport Service, began operations with a Stout 2-AT Pullman airplane transporting 1,000 pounds (450 kg) of freight from Detroit to Chicago.

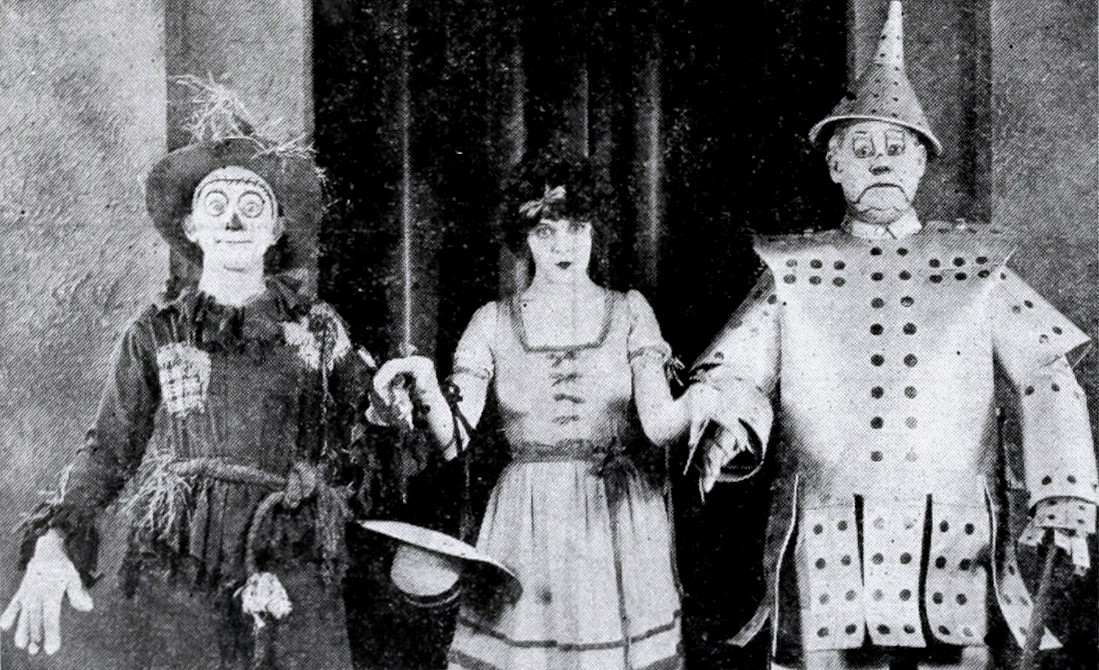
A pre-1939 version of The Wizard of Oz, with Oliver Hardy as The Tin Man

- The Larry Semon-directed film version of The Wizard of Oz was released, with Semon as the Scarecrow, Dorothy Dwan as Dorothy Gale, and comedian Oliver Hardy as the Tin Man.
- Died: Elwood Haynes, 67, American automobile manufacturer, created the second gasoline-powered automobile in the United States, the Haynes-Apperson Pioneer, in 1894; died of congestive heart failure (b. 1857)

== April 14, 1925 (Tuesday) ==
- Tsar Boris III of Bulgaria escaped an assassination attempt when a group of anarchists opened fire on his car as it traveled through the Arabakonak Pass. The King was traveling from Orhanie (now Botevgrad) to the capital, Sofia, when shots were fired at his vehicle from the high banks. King Boris was grazed by a bullet, said to have "clipped his mustache", while one of his servants and the director of the Bulgaria National Museum were killed.
- Born:
  - Rod Steiger, American actor, won the Academy Award for Best Actor for In the Heat of the Night in 1967; as Rodney Steiger, in Westhampton, New York, United States (d. 2002)
  - Gene Ammons, American jazz saxophonist; as Eugene Ammons, in Chicago, United States (d. 1974)
  - Jose Prakash, Indian singer and film actor in Malayalam cinema; as Kunnel Joseph Joseph, in Kottayam, Travancore State, British India (present-day India) (d. 2012)
  - Colin Eglin, white South African politician and Anti-apartheid activist, served as the national leader of the opposition from 1977 to 1979 and 1986 to 1987; in Sea Point, Cape Town, Union of South Africa (present-day South Africa) (d. 2013)
- Died:
  - Paquita Bernardo, 24, Argentine tango music composer and first professional female bandoneon player in Argentine tango; died of a respiratory illness (b. 1900)
  - James J. McArthur, 68, Canadian surveyor and mountaineer who was the first to summit several peaks in the Canadian Rocky Mountains (b. 1856)
  - Madge Oberholtzer, 28, whose violent rape on March 15 by D. C. Stephenson of the Ku Klux Klan of Indiana would lead to the collapse of the organization; died from a staph infection, leading to a murder charge against her attacker (b. 1896)

== April 15, 1925 (Wednesday) ==
- Two major producers of heavy construction equipment, Holt Manufacturing Company and the C. L. Best Tractor Company merged to create the Caterpillar Tractor Company, the world's largest manufacturer of construction equipment.
- Born: Sakina Aliyeva, Soviet Azerbaijani politician, Chair of the Presidium of the Supreme Soviet for the Nakhchivan Autonomous Soviet Socialist Republic from 1963 until her declaration of secession in 1990; in Nakhchivan, Nakhichevan ASSR, Azerbaijan SSR, Soviet Union (present-day Nakhchivan Autonomous Republic, Azerbaijan) (d. 2010)
- Died:
  - Fritz Haarmann, 45, German serial killer convicted of the murder of 24 boys and young men; executed via beheading on the guillotine (b. 1879)
  - John Singer Sargent, 69, American portrait painter, known for works such as Portrait of Madame X (1884), Carnation, Lily, Lily, Rose (1887), and The Daughters of Edward Darley Boit (1882); died of heart disease (b. 1856)

== April 16, 1925 (Thursday) ==
- The St Nedelya Church assault was carried out by terrorists in Bulgaria. A group belonging to the Bulgarian Communist Party blew up the roof of the St Nedelya Church in Sofia, killed 213 people and injured more than 500 others at a funeral service for General Konstantin Georgiev.
- What is now the Hartsfield–Jackson Atlanta International Airport, one of the busiest airports in the world, was founded with a groundbreaking on the site of The Atlanta Speedway, an abandoned racetrack, with 287 acres (116 ha) leased by the city at no cost for five years from Asa Candler of the Coca-Cola Company. The Candler Field airstrip would be ready by September 15, 1926, for its first flight.
- Died:
  - David Powell, 41, Scottish stage and silent-film actor; died of pneumonia (b. 1883)
  - General Stefan Nerezov, 57, Bulgarian General and served as Chief of Staff of the Bulgarian Army; killed in St. Nedelya Church bombing (b. 1867)

== April 17, 1925 (Friday) ==
- Paul Painlevé formed a government of ministers to become the new Prime Minister of France.
- Babe Ruth underwent surgery for what a sports historian would later dub "The Bellyache Heard 'Round the World", as the public was informed he'd suffered indigestion after consuming an excess of hot dogs and soda pop. Ten days earlier, Ruth had collapsed on a train while the New York Yankees were traveling to Asheville, North Carolina and he was hospitalized upon his return to New York. Conflicting accounts exist regarding the true nature of the surgery, but doctors called it "an intestinal abscess".
- The Communist Party of Korea (CPK) was founded in Japanese-ruled Korea (Chōsen) in Keijō (now Seoul) by Kim Yong-bom and Pak Hon-yong. Upon the division of the Korean Peninsula in 1945 and the creation of North Korea, Kim Yong-bom would become the first leader of the ruling Workers' Party of Korea.
- Born:
  - James V. Hartinger, United States Air Force general who served as the Commander-in-Chief of NORAD from 1980 to 1984; in Middleport, Ohio, United States (d. 2000)
  - William G. Bainbridge, United States Army soldier who served as Sergeant Major of the Army from 1975 to 1979; in Galesburg, Illinois, United States (d. 2008)
  - Art Larsen, American tennis player who was ranked among the top ten male tennis players in the world in the early 1950s and won the U.S. Open championship in 1950; as Arthur Larsen, in Hayward, California, United States (d. 2012)
  - Charles Yanofsky, American geneticist; in New York City, United States (d. 2018)
- Died: Dr. Wong Fei-hung, 77, Chinese acupuncturist, martial artist and star of Hong Kong and Chinese film (b. 1847)

== April 18, 1925 (Saturday) ==
- Rioting broke out in Italian stock exchanges during protests against a new government edict stipulating that 25 percent of the value of all stocks and bonds purchased must be paid for in cash. The law was an attempt to curb speculation to help stabilize the lira.
- The San Francisco Chinese Hospital (SFCH), the only hospital in the United States with a specific mission of providing medical care for Chinese immigrants and the only one with a staff fluent in various dialects of the Chinese language, was opened at 835 Jackson Street in the city's Chinatown section with a dedication ceremony attended by Mayor James Rolph of San Francisco and Mayor John L. Davie of Oakland, as well as officials of the Chinese Hospital Association and leading Chinese physicians.
- The International Amateur Radio Union (IARU) was founded.
- Born:
  - William Crook, American diplomat, served as the U.S. Ambassador to Australia from 1968 to 1969 and as the director of Volunteers in Service to America (VISTA) from 1966 to 1968; in Momence, Illinois, United States (d. 1997)
  - Bob Hastings, American actor, best known for his portrayal of Lt. Elroy Carpenter on the sitcom McHale's Navy, and as a voice actor for numerous TV shows; as Robert Hastings, in Brooklyn, New York, United States (d. 2014)
- Died:
  - Charles Ebbets, 65, American sports executive and majority owner of the Brooklyn Dodgers; died of heart failure (b. 1859)
  - Sir Rickman Godlee, 76, British neurosurgeon, known for performing the first removal of a brain tumor by operating on an exposed brain in 1884 (b. 1849)

== April 19, 1925 (Sunday) ==
- Colo-Colo, the most successful and popular soccer football team in the South American nation of Chile, was founded at the El Llano Stadium in San Miguel, Santiago, by footballer David Arellano and some of his teammates who had also left the Deportes Magallanes club. The team was named in honor of Colocolo, Chief of the Mapuche's defense in the Arauco War against the Spanish colonists. In its first 100 years, including the 2024 season, Colo-Colo won 34 league championships.
- Born:
  - Hugh O'Brian, American actor and humanitarian, starred in the Western television series The Life and Legend of Wyatt Earp, founder of the Hugh O'Brian Youth Leadership Foundation; as Hugh Charles Krampe, in Rochester, New York, United States (d. 2016)
  - Eva Rickard, New Zealand activist for Māori ancestral land rights and for women's rights; as Tuaiwa Hautai Kereopa, in Whāingaroa, New Zealand (d. 1997)
  - Trevor D. Ford, English geologist and paleontologist; at Westcliffe-on-Sea, Southend-on-Sea, Essex, England (d. 2017)
  - Captain Manuel J. Fernandez, American flying ace credited with shooting down 14 MiG fighters during the Korean War, recipient of the Distinguished Service Cross in 1953; in Key West, Florida, United States (d. 1980)
- Died: J. W. Smith, 80, American politician, served as the Governor of Maryland from 1900 to 1904 and as the U.S. Senator from Maryland from 1908 to 1921 (b. 1845)

== April 20, 1925 (Monday) ==
- Vitagraph Studios, founded in 1897 and the most successful movie company during the first two decades of the 20th century, was purchased from owner Albert E. Smith by the Warner Bros. studio, bringing an end to the Vitagraph company.
- Erie Insurance Group, a Fortune 500 company since 2003, was founded by H.O. Hirt and O.G. Crawford, two former salesmen of the Pennsylvania Indemnity Exchange.

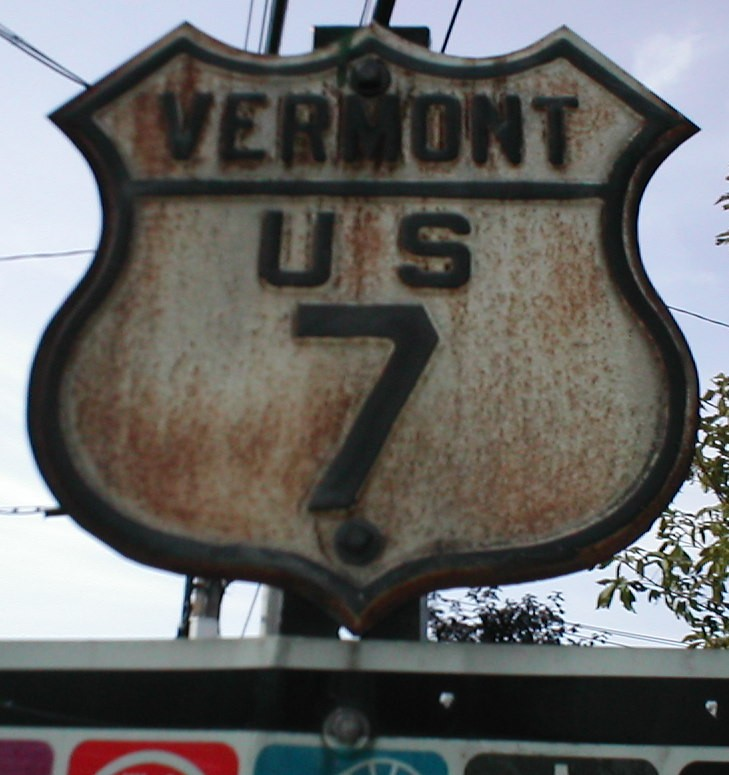
An old U.S. Route marker

- The use of a sign in the shape of a shield, to mark a federally-funded highway in the U.S., was made a standard at a meeting of the Joint Board on Interstate Highways, as boardmember Lou A. Boulay of Ohio suggested the shape for numbered U.S. Routes.
- Minsky's Burlesque was raided by police in New York as authorities began to crack down on burlesque houses for featuring racy striptease performances. Although a minor incident at the time, it became famous when it was retold in the 1960 novel The Night They Raided Minsky's, which led to the 1968 comedy musical film of the same name.
- The Polish language Chicago daily newspaper Dziennik Ludowy (People's Daily) ceased publication after 18 years.
- Charles Mellor won the 20th Boston Marathon.
- Born: Ernie Stautner, German-American professional football player; as Ernest Alfred Stautner, in Prinzing near Cham, Bavaria, Germany (d. 2006)
- Died: Eric Tigerstedt, 37, Finnish inventor nicknamed "The Thomas Edison of Finland;" died of tuberculosis (b. 1887)

== April 21, 1925 (Tuesday) ==
- All 38 crew of the Japanese cargo ship SS Raifuku Maru died when the ship sank in a storm while transporting wheat from the U.S. to Germany. After the ship's telegraphist, Masao Hiwatari, sent a distress singal "Now very danger! Come quick!", two British ocean liners, RMS Homeric and SS King Alexander reached the vessel off the coast of Nova Scotia and Canada, but were unable to get close enough for a rescue because of the heavy seas. Because the ship was listing at a 30-degree angle, none of the crew were able to lower lifeboats or to evacuate. RMS Homeric sent the message "Observed steamer Rafuku Maru sink in Lat 4143N Long 6139W Regret unable to save any lives."
- In Saudi Arabia, as part of a campaign by the Wahhabi Muslim-led government of the former Kingdom of Nejd to eradicate shrines associated with the Hejaz Muslims, the mausoleums and domes at Al-Baqi Cemetery at Medina were torn down, along with markers of the gravesites of members of the family of the Prophet Muhammad.
- Italian aviator Francesco de Pinedo and mechanic Ernesto Campanelli departed Rome on an unprecedented airplane trip with a goal of flying from Italy to Australia and then back to Rome by way of Tokyo. Pinedo's SIAI S.16 flying boat Gennariello would arrive in Australia on June 10 by way of what are now Greece, Iraq, Persia, Iran, Pakistan, India, Burma, Malaysia, Singapore and Indonesia and, after layovers in Australia and Japan, return to Rome by November 7 to complete a 35,000 miles (56,000 km) journey.
- King Features President Moses Koenigsberg presented a "Phonofilm", made by the company owned by inventor Lee de Forest, to a gathering of editors and publishers in New York City. Shot the week before, Calvin Coolidge became the first U.S. president to talk on film as he delivered a four-minute address.
- Born:
  - Michel Ter-Pogossian, German-born Armenian American medical physicist known for his research into positron emission tomography and the creation of the PET scan; in Berlin, Germany (d. 1996)
  - Rita Macedo, Mexican actress and fashion designer, 1972 Ariel Award winner for Best Actress; as María de la Concepción Macedo Guzmán, in Mexico City, Mexico (d. 1993, committed suicide)
  - Sidney Pollard, Austrian born British economist; as Sigfried Pollak, in Vienna, Austria (d. 1998)
  - Carl H. Dodd, U.S. Army soldier and Medal of Honor recipient for heroism in the Korean War; in Cotes, Kentucky, United States (d. 1996)

== April 22, 1925 (Wednesday) ==
- The Peace Preservation Law was enacted in Japan to prohibit and to allow the Special Higher Police (Tokubetsu Kōtō Keisatsu or Tokkō) of the Home Ministry to arrest "anyone who has formed an association with the aim of altering the kokutai" (a vague reference to the "national essence" of Japan) or having "joined such an association with full knowledge of its object". Mere criticism of the government could be considered an attempt to alter the national essence in order to justify a person's arrest, and their incarceration for up to 10 years. Under the law, the "Thought Section" of the Tokubetsu was set up to monitor "dangerous thoughts" or "thought crime" within Japan and its territories. The Tokkō would arrest over 700,000 people until Japan's surrender in 1945 at the end of World War II.
- The Saltair pavilion, a famous bath house resort in Saltair, Utah at the Great Salt Lake in the United States, was destroyed by fire.
- Born: George Cole, English actor; in Morden, South London, England (d. 2015)
- Died:
  - André Caplet, 46, French composer and conductor, served as the director of the Boston Opera Company; died from pleurisy after having been gassed in World War I (b. 1878 )
  - Lucy Cavendish, 83, British philanthropist and champion of girls' and women's education (b. 1841)
  - Norman Thorne, 23-24, English chicken farmer convicted of murdering his fiancée Elsie Cameron, on December 5, 1924, and dismembering her body; hanged at Wandsworth Prison (b. c. 1902)

== April 23, 1925 (Thursday) ==
- The body of cave explorer Floyd Collins was removed from Sand Cave in what is now Mammoth Cave National Park, almost two months after he had become trapped underground and died. In 1927, Collins's remains would be exhumed and placed on display inside another cave, until being reburied in 1989.
- In the British Protectorate of Nigeria, the death of Usman II dan Maje Karofi the Emir of the autonomous Kano Emirate gave the British the opportunity to abolish slavery within the Kano royal family. In return for being backed as the new Kano ruler, Abdullahi Bayero agreed to free the remaining slaves.
- The Italian ocean liner SS Conte Biancamano was launched.
- Actress Frances Howard married film producer Samuel Goldwyn.
- The Dutch public broadcasting organization Katholieke Radio Omroep was founded.

== April 24, 1925 (Friday) ==
- A border treaty was signed in Warsaw between Czechoslovakia and Poland. The treaty came after an agreement had been arbitrated by the League of Nations to settle the border dispute between the two Eastern European countries.
- Former German Crown Prince Wilhelm stated that he saw a chance for restoration of the German monarchy in the event of a victory for monarchist candidate Paul von Hindenburg in the April 26 election.
- Born:
  - Eugen Weber, Romanian-born American historian; in Bucharest, Kingdom of Romania (present-day Romania) (d. 2007)
  - Dorothy Butler, New Zealand author of children's books; as Muriel Dorothy Norgrove, in Grey Lynn, Auckland, New Zealand (d. 2015)
  - Faye Dancer, American professional baseball player in the AAGPBL; in Santa Monica, California, United States (d. 2002)

== April 25, 1925 (Saturday) ==
- Sheffield United F.C. defeated Cardiff City 1–0 in the FA Cup Final in England. Sheffield had finished 14th in the 22-team English League, and Cardiff City 11th, while League champion Huddersfield Town had lost in the first round.
- Shamrock Rovers F.C. of South Dublin finished in first place in the League of Ireland, the premier soccer football league of the Republic of Ireland, with a record of 13 wins and 5 draws, ahead of Bohemians, with 11 wins, 1 loss and 6 draws. In their two meetings, Shamrock Rovers and Bohemians had played to a 1 to 1 draw, and Bohemians' only loss was to third-place finisher Shelbourne F.C.
- Born:
  - Zofia Kielan-Jaworowska, Polish paleontologist noted for discovering the dinosaur species Deinocheirus and Gallimimus; as Zofia Kielan, in Sokołów Podlaski, Poland (d. 2015). Two other dinosaur species, Kielanodon and Zofiabaatar ware named in her honor.
  - Herb Selwyn, American attorney and LGBT activist; as Herbert Seligman, in Hollywood, California, United States (d. 2016)
  - James U. Cross, U.S. Air Force officer, pilot of Air Force One for U.S. President Lyndon Johnson; in Andalusia, Alabama, United States (d. 2015)
  - Kay E. Kuter, American actor; in Los Angeles, United States (d. 2003)

== April 26, 1925 (Sunday) ==
- Paul von Hindenburg won the run-off of the German presidential election. Neither Karl Jarres (who had the plurality of almost 39% of the votes on March 29), and Otto Braun (who had 29%) participated in the second round. Hindenburg, who wasn't a candidate in the first round of voting finished ahead of Wilhelm Marx with 14,655,641 votes to Marx's 13,751,605.
- Franz Kafka's final novel, Der Prozess (later translated to English in 1937 as The Trial) was published for the first time, a little more than nine months after his June 3, 1924, death.
- Edna Ferber won the Pulitzer Prize for her novel So Big.
- The Berlin Mosque, designed by architect K. A. Hermann, was opened to German Muslims.
- Born:
  - Michele Ferrero, Italian businessman and owner of the chocolate manufacturer Ferrero SpA, at the time of death he was 20th wealthiest person in the world and the richest person in Italy; near Turin in Dogliani, Piedmont, Kingdom of Italy (present-day Italy) (d. 2015)
  - Jørgen Ingmann, Danish jazz and pop music guitarist; as Jørgen Ingmann Pedersen, in Copenhagen, Denmark (d. 2015)

== April 27, 1925 (Monday) ==
- France began air raids in the Rif War in Morocco, employing the Armée de l'Air for the next nine years against the Moroccan nationalists.
- Government High School was opened by the colonial government in the Bahamas as the first public high school for black Bahamians and for girls who had been excluded from all of the private schools in the colony.
- Bulgarian authorities claimed they seized 400 pounds of explosives from conspirators plotting to blow up several public buildings in Varna.
- The murder of William Plommer occurred in Sheffield, England. The case became international news as a gang of eleven men were arrested and tried.
- Born: Edel von Rothe, German ballet dancer and the prima ballerina for the Deutsche Oper am Rhein in Düsseldorf; in Berlin, Germany (d. 2008)

== April 28, 1925 (Tuesday) ==
- Presenting the government's budget, Chancellor of the Exchequer Winston Churchill announced Britain's return to the gold standard.
- The Gorilla, written by Ralph Spence and produced by Donald Gallaher, premiered on Broadway for the first of 257 performances.
- The International Exposition of Modern Industrial and Decorative Arts (French: L'Exposition internationale des arts décoratifs et industriels modernes) was inaugurated in Paris before a crowd of 4,000 invited guests, and opened to the public the next day. The term "Art Deco" was derived by shortening the French title of the exposition, and this show also did much to popularize the style worldwide. The exposition would continue for almost six months until closing on October 25.
- The German comedy film The Found Bride premiered in Berlin.
- Died: P. Theagaraya Chetty, 73, Indian politician and lawyer, served as the Chairman of the South Indian Liberal Federation from 1917 until his death (b. 1852)

== April 29, 1925 (Wednesday) ==
- English inventor Grindell Matthews announced he was putting the finishing touches on his "luminaphone", a machine operated by rays of light that worked like a pipe organ.
- Died:
  - Ed McKeever, 56, American construction-contractor and co-owner of the Brooklyn Dodgers baseball team with Charles Ebbets; died of influenza after getting catching a cold at the funeral of fellow Dodgers co-owner Charles Ebbets (b. 1859)
  - Ralph D. Paine, 53, American journalist and author, served as a member of the New Hampshire House of Representatives from 1918 to 1920 (b. 1871)

== April 30, 1925 (Thursday) ==
- The first Australian International Motor Show was held in Melbourne.
- Born: Johnny Horton, American country, honky tonk and rockabilly musician, known for his 1959 recording of the song "The Battle of New Orleans", as well as "Sink the Bismarck" and "North to Alaska"; as John Horton, in Los Angeles, United States (d. 1960)
