= March 1925 =

Month of 1925

<<	March 1925					>>
Su	Mo	Tu	We	Th	Fr	Sa
1	2	3	4	5	6	7
8	9	10	11	12	13	14
15	16	17	18	19	20	21
22	23	24	25	26	27	28
29	30	31

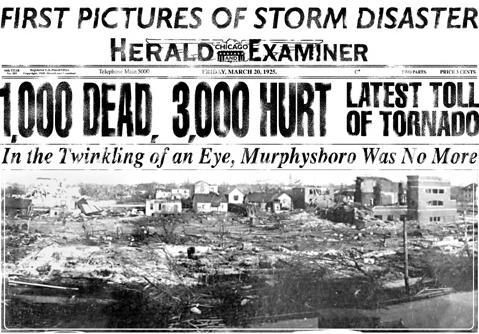
March 18, 1925: Deadliest tornado in U.S. history kills hundreds of people.

The following events occurred in March 1925:

== March 1, 1925 (Sunday) ==
- Elections were held in Luxembourg for the 47-seat parliament, Der Chamber. The conservative Rietspartei, led by Prime Minister Émile Reuter, lost four seats from its 26-seat majority. While the Rietspartei retained a plurality with 22, it refused to form a coalition with any party that had voted against the railway treaty with Belgium, prompting other parties to form a new government.

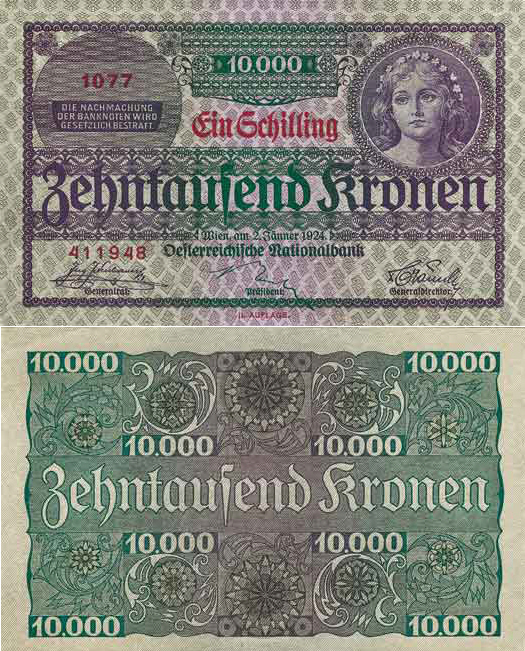
"Ein Schilling", worth "Zehntausend Kronen"

- The Republic of Austria adopted its new currency, the Austrian schilling, worth 10,000 of the former Austrian kronen. The new schilling would be the currency of Austria until the republic's annexation by Germany in 1938, then restored in 1945 after World War II, and be replaced by the Euro in 1999.
- The publisher Viking Press was founded in New York by Harold K. Guinzburg (formerly of Simon and Schuster) and George S. Oppenheimer, advertising manager for Alfred A. Knopf, Inc.
- A military committee in France, led by Marshal Ferdinand Foch, concluded that Germany had committed gross violations of the disarmament provisions laid down in the Treaty of Versailles.
- The film The Mad Whirl, starring May McAvoy and Jack Mulhall, was released.
- The Club Cerro Corá soccer football team was founded in Paraguay.
- Born:
  - Lucine Amara, American opera soprano for the Metropolitan Opera in New York; as Lucine Armaganian, in Hartford, Connecticut, United States (d. 2024)
  - Rudolf Leopold, Austrian physician and art collector whose set of 5,000 works of art was donated to the Austrian government to create the Leopold Museum; in Vienna, Austria (d. 2010)
  - M. A. Sattar, Bangladesh entrepreneur and politician, founder of Sattar & Company Ltd.; as Mohammad Abdus Sattar, in Durgapur, Bengal Presidency, British India (present-day Bangladesh) (d. 2009)
  - Martín Chirino, Spanish sculptor; in Las Palmas, Canary Islands (d. 2019)
- Died:
  - Adolf von Steiger, 65, Swiss politician, served as the Chancellor of Switzerland from 1919 until his death; died of a stroke (b. 1859)
  - Thomas Bidgood, 66, English composer, composed "Sons of the Brave;" committed suicide (b. 1858)
  - Homer Plessy, 61–66, American shoemaker who was the plaintiff in the case of Plessy v. Ferguson, a landmark U.S. Supreme Court ruling that racial segregation was constitutional under the separate but equal legal doctrine (b. 1858, 1862, or 1863)

== March 2, 1925 (Monday) ==
- What would become Delta Air Lines began as the world's first aerial crop dusting company with the founding of Huff Daland Dusters Inc., in Macon, Georgia. to combat the boll weevil infestation of cotton crops. The Huff-Daland Aero Corporation had constructed the first airplane that could incorporate a means of carrying and dispersing insecticide across farm fields. On December 3, 1928, a new group of investors would acquire the Huff-Daland assets and create Delta Air Service, with passenger service starting in 1930.
- Lauri Kristian Relander was inaugurated to a six-year term as the President of Finland, serving until 1931.
- Harlan F. Stone took his seat on the United States Supreme Court, replacing the retired Joseph McKenna.
- Born: P. K. Balakrishnan, Indian novelist; as Panikkassery Keshavan Balakrishnan, in Trivandrum, Bombay Province, British India (present-day Thiruvananthapuram, Kerala state, India) (d. 1991)
- Died: Luigj Gurakuqi, 46, Albanian writer and politician, served as Albania's Minister of Economy and Finance; shot to death in the Italian city of Bari, where he had been living since the Ahmet Zogu's return to power and inauguration as president (b. 1879). His assassin, Balto Stambolla, was an agent of Albania's Internal Affairs Ministry dispatched to carry out the killing.

== March 3, 1925 (Tuesday) ==
- İsmet İnönü formed a cabinet for the fourth time as Prime Minister of Turkey after the resignation of Fethi Okyar and Okyar's ministers. His first act on taking office as to invoke the "Law for the Maintenance of Order" in order to control the Kurdish rebellion, giving the government emergency powers to close organizations deemed to be subversive.
- The United Kingdom followed the example of other nations owed indemnities from the Boxer Rebellion of 1900, agreeing to use its share of several million dollars to support railway construction in China.
- The United States Congress authorized the Mount Rushmore Memorial Commission.
- Born:
  - Joe Sentieri, Italian singer and actor; as Rino Luigi Sentieri, in Genoa, Kingdom of Italy (present-day Italy) (d. 2007)
  - Richard Battin, American computer scientist who oversaw the design of the compact Apollo Guidance Computer used on the Apollo program missions; in Atlantic City, New Jersey, United States (d. 2014)
- Died: Agustín de Iturbide y Green, 61, claimant to the Imperial House of Iturbide as the grandson of Agustín I, who briefly reigned as Emperor of Mexico for eight months in 1822 and 1823 (b. 1863)

== March 4, 1925 (Wednesday) ==
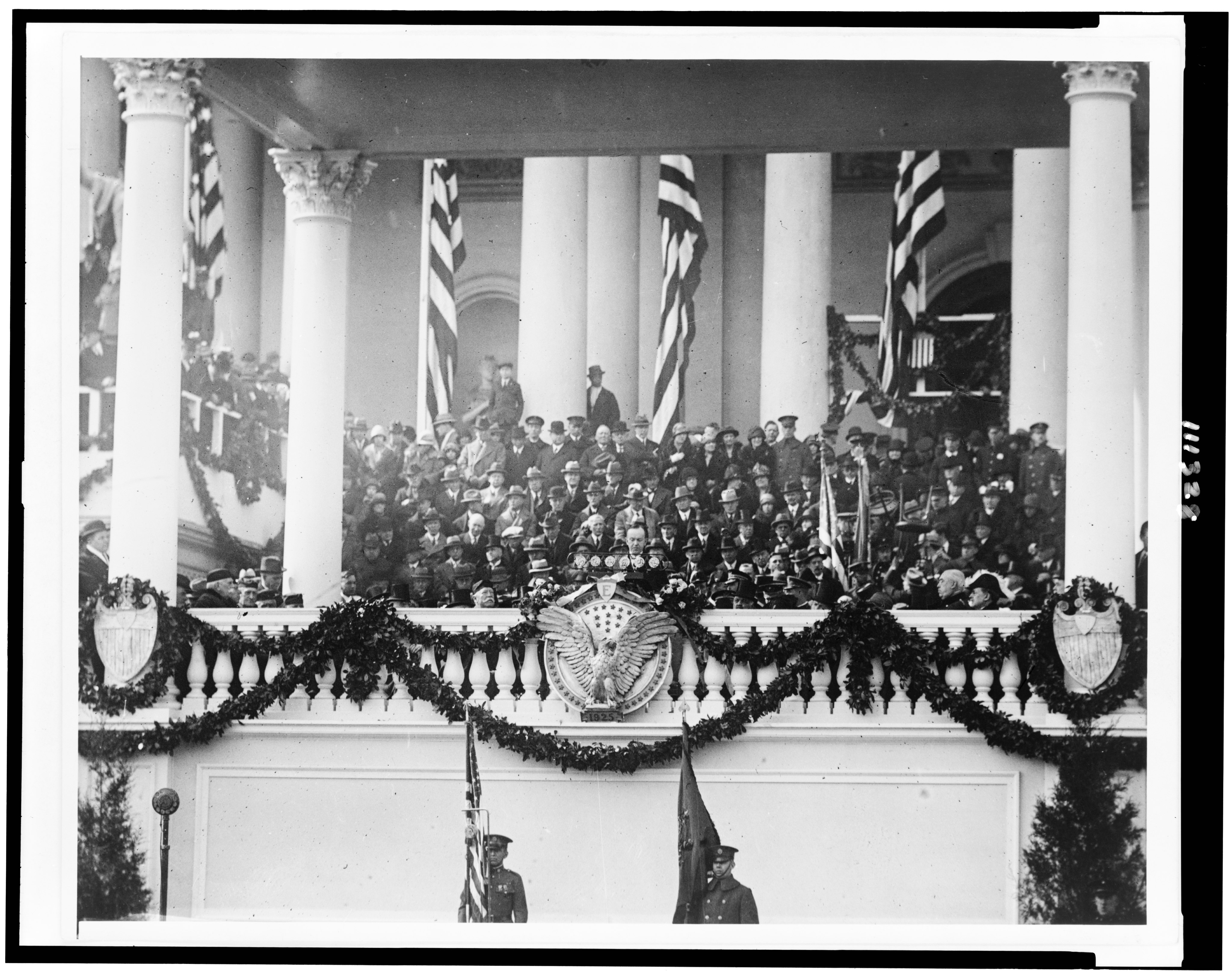
President Coolidge giving his inaugural address

- The second inauguration of Calvin Coolidge took place in Washington, D.C. It was the first U.S. presidential inauguration to be nationally broadcast on radio.
- The Federal Probation Act was signed into law in the U.S., giving federal courts the option to sentence defendants to probation instead of a federal prison sentence following conviction of a crime, as well as creating a system of probation and parole officers.
- Born:
  - Paul Mauriat, French orchestra conductor; in Marseille, France (d. 2006)
  - Inezita Barroso, Brazilian sertanejo singer, actress and TV host; as Ignez Magdalena Aranha de Lima, in São Paulo, Brazil (d. 2015)
- Died:
  - John Montgomery Ward, 65, American professional baseball pitcher and inductee of the National Baseball Hall of Fame, known for having the lowest ERA in Major League Baseball in 1878, and leader in strikeouts and games won in 1879; died of pneumonia (b. 1860)
  - Moritz Moszkowski, 70, German-Polish composer; died of stomach cancer (b. 1854)
  - James Ward, 82, English philosopher and psychologist (b. 1843)

== March 5, 1925 (Thursday) ==
- Frank B. Kellogg became United States Secretary of State.
- Charles Lindbergh was in a serious flight accident during his pilot training with the U.S. Army Air Service when his SE-5 collided in midair with that of another cadet. Lindbergh parachuted to safety and thus joined the Caterpillar Club.
- Born:
  - Jacques Vergès, French-Algerian lawyer known for representing defendants in war crimes and terrorist trials; in Ubon Ratchathani, Kingdom of Siam (present-day Thailand) (d. 2013)
  - Van E. Chandler, U.S. Army Air Force pilot who became the youngest flying ace of World War II, downing his fifth airplane in combat by the age of 19; in Kemp, Texas, United States (d. 1998)

== March 6, 1925 (Friday) ==
- The Eupen-Malmedy region was transferred from Germany to Belgium, as per the Treaty of Versailles, including the cities of Malmedy, Eugen, Sankt Vith, Waimes, Bütgenbach and Kelmis.
- The periodical Pionerskaya Pravda was founded in Moscow.
- Miners went on strike in the Canadian province of Nova Scotia.
- Born: Audrey Evans, British-born American pediatric oncologist known for her contributions in reducing the rate of deaths from neuroblastoma and for co-founding the original Ronald McDonald House; in York, Yorkshire, England (d. 2022)
- Died: Jacques Raverat, 39, French painter; died of multiple sclerosis (b. 1885)

== March 7, 1925 (Saturday) ==
- The Social Democratic Party of Germany voted to nominate Otto Braun as their candidate for the March 29 presidential election.
- Born: Rene Gagnon, United States Marine known for raising the U.S. flag following the American victory in the Battle of Iwo Jima; in Manchester, New Hampshire, United States (d. 1979)
- Died: Georgy Lvov, 63, Russian aristocrat and statesman, served as the first Prime Minister of the Russian Republic from March 15 to July 20, 1917 when he was installed as the leader of the provisional government following the February Revolution (b. 1861)

== March 8, 1925 (Sunday) ==
- In Egypt, Alan Rowe, the deputy director of George Andrew Reisner's Harvard-Boston Expedition, became the first person in 4,500 years to open the chamber of the tomb of Hetepheres I, the mother of the Pharaoh Cheops and the Queen consort of the Pharaoh Sneferu.
- Dr. Herman Bundesen, Commissioner of the Chicago Department of Public Health announced in an article in the department's weekly bulletin that the ongoing crossword puzzle fad caused no ill health effects from headaches or eye strain, as had previously been feared, and was beneficial to health in general. In a feature titled "Cross-Worditis", Bundesen noted humorously that "The savage little cross-word microbe may be largely explained by the fact that part of our lives and much energy must be put into amusement, to satisfy the play instinct within us. Therefore any play or game that has a mental 'kick' in it, is quickly accepted and eagerly pursued."
- Born: Dennis Lotis, South African-born British swing music and pop music singer; in Johannesburg, Union of South Africa (present-day South Africa) (d. 2023)
- Died: Saint Manuel Míguez González, 93, Spanish Roman Catholic priest and founder of the Calasanzian Institute (b. 1831)

== March 9, 1925 (Monday) ==
- "Pink's War" began as a seven-week bombardment campaign in British India conducted by RAF Wing Commander Richard Pink against the rebellious Mahsud tribesmen in South Waziristan in the North-West Frontier Province (now part of Pakistan). The campaign halted on May 1 after Mahsud tribal leaders sought a peace agreement.
- The German state of Bavaria imposed a two-year ban against public speaking by Adolf Hitler, limiting him to addressing only private, closed meetings. The government was nervous at the large crowd of 3,000 Fascists that Hitler had drawn on February 27 at the Bürgerbräukeller in Munich in his first public speech since his release from prison.
- Born:
  - Ellen Hovde, American public television documentary producer and 2002 Primetime Emmy Awards winner; in Meadville, Pennsylvania, United States (d. 2023)
  - Virginia Mathews, Osage American author and literacy advocate; in New York City, United States (d. 2011)
  - Gil Askey, American musical director and jazz trumpeter; as Gilbert Askey, in Austin, Texas, United States (d. 2014)
- Died:
  - Willard Metcalf, 66, American landscape painter; died of a heart attack (b. 1858)
  - Angela Pinto, 55, Portuguese theatre actress (b. 1869)
  - George Field, 47, American silent film actor known for The Prospector's Vengeance, died of tuberculosis.

== March 10, 1925 (Tuesday) ==
- A young member of the Nazi Party, Otto Rothstock, entered the office of Austrian Jewish writer Hugo Bettauer in Vienna and shot him five times at point blank range. Rothstock was angered by Bettauer's novel Stadt ohne Juden (The City Without Jews) which satirized antisemitism. Bettauer died of his wounds on March 27.
- The nomination of Charles B. Warren for Attorney General of the United States, was rejected by the U.S. Senate after Democrats and some Republicans had concerns over whether Warren would enforce federal antitrust laws. U.S. President Calvin Coolidge had nominated Warren after his March 4 inauguration. On the first vote, the Senate was tied at 40 to 40. Coolidge's Vice President Charles G. Dawes would have broken the tie in favor of Warren, but Dawes did not arrive at the U.S. Capitol in time to resolve the tie. On the next vote, Warren's nomination failed, 39 to 41. Another vote was taken on March 16 before 47 of the 48 Senators, and Warren was rejected by a vote of 39 to 46.
- The island of Cyprus, ceded from Turkey to the United Kingdom in 1923, became a Crown Colony of the British Empire, with Malcolm Stevenson as the first colonial Governor.
- Olympiacos F.C., as of 2024 the winner of 47 championships in Greece's top-level professional soccer football league, was founded in Piraeus.
- Born: Ace Reid, American cartoonist and creator of the Cowpokes comic strip; as Asa Elmer Reid, Jr., in Lelia Lake, Texas, United States (d. 1991)
- Died: Myer Prinstein, 46, Polish-born American track athlete, 1900 and 1904 Olympic gold medalist in the triple jump; died of a heart ailment (b. 1878)

== March 11, 1925 (Wednesday) ==
- The musical, "No, No, Nanette" with music by Vincent Youmans and lyrics by Irving Caesar and Otto Harbach, had its West End premiere at London's Palace Theatre for the first of 665 performances. The musical, known for introducing the song "Tea for Two", had a run in Chicago prior to premiering on the West End and on Broadway (where it would debut on September 16, 1925) at the Globe Theatre and run for 321 performances.
- The League of Nations shelved all action on limiting the private manufacture of arms. The move was made ahead of the conference on limitation of arms trafficking to open on May 4, as it was thought that the United States would oppose such action on the grounds of the business being too lucrative.
- Born:
  - Roger Gimbel, American TV movie producer; in Philadelphia, United States (d. 2011)
  - Duncan Ndegwa, Kenyan economist and the first African to serve as Governor of the Central Bank of Kenya; in Nyeri County, Kenya (alive in 2026)

== March 12, 1925 (Thursday) ==
- The Japanese passenger ship Uwajima Maru No. 6 foundered off of the coast of the island of Kabashima, killing 102 of the 118 people aboard. Only 15 passengers and the ship's purser were able to escape on a lifeboat.
- The British government decided to reject the Geneva Protocol for the Prohibition of the Use in War of Asphyxiating, Poisonous or other Gases (eventually signed in June of the same year). Britain's Foreign Minister Austen Chamberlain told the League of Nations that the lack of participation by the United States in the League effectively rendered the Protocol unenforceable.
- The first voyage of the new American Palestine Line began as the SS President Arthur (formerly the U.S. Navy transport Princess Matoika) departed New York City with 400 passengers en route to Haifa in Palestine.
- In Germany, the Großdeutsche Volksgemeinschaft (GVG), a right-wing organization that had been established by Alfred Rosenberg and Julius Streicher during the temporary ban of the Nazi Party, was formally disbanded as the Nazi Party became legal again. Almost all of the GVG members rejoined the Nazis.
- In Ireland, retired General W. R. E. Murphy, Commissioner of the Dublin Metropolitan Police, launched overnight raids on all of the brothels ("Kip-Houses") in the Irish capital, bringing an end to the tolerance of prostitution.
- Born:
  - Leo Esaki, Japanese physicist and 1973 Nobel Prize in Physics laureate for his creation of the Esaki diode; in Takida-mura, Osaka Prefecture, Empire of Japan (present-day Japan) (alive in 2026)
  - John Linsley, American physicist and pioneer in cosmic rays research; in Minneapolis, United States (d. 2002)
  - Ariel G. Loewy, Romanian-born American biochemist and cell biologist known for his identification of the enzyme Factor XIII; in Bucharest, Kingdom of Romania (present-day Romania) (d. 2001)
- Died:
  - Dr. Sun Yat-sen, 58, Chinese revolutionary and founder of the first Republic of China, chairman of the ruling Kuomintang party from 1919 until his death; died of cancer of the gall bladder (b. 1866)
  - Francis Taylor Piggott, 72, British jurist and author, served as the Chief Justice of the Supreme Court of Hong Kong from 1905 to 1912 (b. 1852)
  - Sir James Outram, 60, British mountaineer who made the first ascents of eight mountains in the Canadian Rockies (b. 1864)

== March 13, 1925 (Friday) ==
- The Hay-Quesada Treaty between Cuba and the United States was ratified by the U.S. Senate, recognizing that the Isla de Pinos (now Isla de la Juventud), owned primarily by U.S. companies and citizens, was the territory of Cuba.
- In Halle, Germany, six Communists were killed and 30 wounded when police broke up a communist demonstration.
- Born: Baba Yabo, Beninese comedian and actor; as Dèhoumon Adjagnon, in Porto-Novo, French Dahomey (present-day Benin) (d. 1985)
- Died: Lucille Ricksen, 14, American silent film actress; died of tuberculosis (b. 1910)

== March 14, 1925 (Saturday) ==
- France's Senate Finance Committee voted to keep its embassy at the Vatican, over the wishes of Prime Minister Édouard Herriot.
- The Council of the League of Nations expressed hope that Germany would apply to join in September.
- At Philadelphia, the two best teams in the Ivy League (officially, the Eastern Intercollegiate League) played against each other to conclude the season. The 16-5 Penn Quakers upset the 21-1 Princeton Tigers by a single point, 29 to 28. Despite the loss, Princeton would be retroactively selected by historians as the best team of the 1924–1925 season.
- Born:
  - William Clay Ford Sr., American businessman and billionaire who owned the Detroit Lions NFL team from 1964 until his death, and chaired the Ford Motor Company's Design Committee from 1957 to 1989; in Detroit, United States (d. 2014)
  - Abdel Hadi Al Gazzar, Egyptian painter; in Alexandria, Kingdom of Egypt (present-day Egypt) (d. 1966)
- Died: Walter Camp, 65, American college football coach known as "The Father of American Football" for his remaking of the rules of the gridiron game, including the system of downs for gaining a specific amount of yardage from the location where first down started, and for creating the line of scrimmage for a specific place on the field (b. 1859)

== March 15, 1925 (Sunday) ==
- Albania's Foreign Minister Mufid Libohova signed an agreement with a Mario Alberti, Director of the Italian bank Credito Italiano to back the creation of the National Bank of Albania.
- The films Riders of the Purple Sage and Heart of a Siren were released.
- Lewis W. Thompson of Denver, Colorado, fell 700 feet (210 m) to his death from the South Rim of the Grand Canyon while posing for a photo. According to a later report, "Thompson motored to Grand Canyon with two friends... the party went walking along the Rim path toward Grandeur point. About a quarter mile from El Tovar hotel, Thompson paused and called Miss Vivian Hesse of Winslow to take his picture. The camera caught him in the act of going backward with arms overthrown and eyes closed."
- Born: Andy McCall, Scottish footballer; in Hamilton, Lanarkshire, Scotland (d. 2014)
- Died:
  - Sam Dreben, 46, Ukrainian-born American soldier of fortune and U.S. Army veteran nicknamed "The Fighting Jew" (b. 1878)
  - Mordecai Spector, 66, Ukrainian-born American Yiddish language novelist (b. 1858)

== March 16, 1925 (Monday) ==
- A 7.0 magnitude earthquake killed an estimated 5,000 people as it struck the Chinese province of Yunnan at 10:42 p.m. local time. In Dali City alone, 3,600 people were killed and 1,200 more died in Fengyi in Sichuan province.
- A 5,000-mile high speed communications cable between the United States and Italy was officially activated by envoy to the United States Giacomo De Martino.
- The horror-comedy film The Monster, starring Lon Chaney, was released.
- Born:
  - Cornell Borchers, Lithuanian-born American actress and singer; as Gerlind Cornelia Borchers, in Silute, Lithuania (d. 2014)
  - Luis E. Miramontes, Mexican chemist who synthesized the first oral contraceptive, progestin norethisterone; in Tepic, Nayarit, Mexico (d. 2004)

== March 17, 1925 (Tuesday) ==
- Czechoslovak Foreign Minister Edvard Beneš proposed a "United States of Europe", divided into two groups of roughly equal power, to secure peace. England, France, Belgium, Germany and Spain could make up the western bloc, while Poland, Romania, Czechoslovakia, Austria and others could make up the eastern bloc.
- An explosion at a coal mine near Barrackville, West Virginia killed 33 miners.
- Born: Gabriele Ferzetti, Italian film actor; as Pasquale Ferzetti, in Rome, Kingdom of Italy (present-day Italy) (d. 2015)

== March 18, 1925 (Wednesday) ==
- The Tri-State Tornado, the deadliest in U.S. history with at least 751 deaths, swept across the states of Missouri, Illinois and Indiana. Hardest hit was the town of Murphysboro, Illinois, where 234 people died, the highest toll in any single U.S. community from a tornado. In West Frankfort, Illinois, 102 died; Griffin, Indiana, 46 people; and 44 perished in Princeton, Indiana.
- The Yunnan–Guangxi War began in China's Yunnan province, six days after the death of Kuomintang leader Sun Yat-sen, as Yunnan's leader, Tang Jiyao, announced that he would take control of the Kumonintang from the acting leader, Hu Hanmin. Tang led an invasion of the Guangxi province and the National Revolutionary Army, led by Chiang Kai-shek, would successfully defend the Hu government for almost two years, during which thousands of people, mostly civilians, would die.
- A fire in northeastern Tokyo destroyed 3,000 buildings.
- Two floors of Madame Tussauds wax museum in London were destroyed by fire. John Theodore Tussaud, the curator, commented that "All our priceless treasures are gone. Even those irreplaceable relics of Napoleon which have been preserved by one family for more than a century." Firefighters were able to save the molds from which the wax figures were cast, but Tussaud questioned whether the task of several years in rebuilding the collection would be worth the effort.
- The Breakers, the preeminent luxury hotel in Palm Beach, Florida, burned down after the wife of Chicago mayor William Hale Thompson left an electric curling iron plugged in. All of the people inside escaped unharmed, including film actress Billie Burke and General Foods owner Marjorie Merriweather Post.
- Born:
  - Myra, Lady Butter, Scottish British aristocrat and thoroughbred horse owner; as Myra Alice Wernher, in Edinburgh, Scotland (d. 2022)
  - Don Paul, American professional football player; in Fresno, California, United States (d. 2014)
- Died: Maria Anna Donati, 76, Italian Roman Catholic nun who established the Calasanzian Sisters order (b. 1848)

== March 19, 1925 (Thursday) ==
New Mexico's flag

- The U.S. state of New Mexico adopted its distinctive yellow flag.
- U.S. President Calvin Coolidge invited the nations of the world to participate in the Sesquicentennial Exposition to be held in Philadelphia in 1926.
- American serial killer Martha Wise confessed to poisoning 17 members of her family, including her mother, her aunt and her uncle, whose illness and death were traced to arsenic. Mrs. Wise's admission came under questioning by the sheriff of Medina County, Ohio, Fred Roshon, who had connected her to the crime the day before when he discovered that she had purchased a large quantity of arsenic from a drug store the day before the family members had become ill. Convicted of murder, she would remain in prison until her death 46 years later.
- The classic jazz tune "Sweet Georgia Brown" was first recorded by its author, bandleader Ben Bernie along with his Hotel Roosevelt Orchestra. The record was released the next day, and would spend five weeks as the number-one record on the U.S. charts.
- The British government announced that it was proceeding with the development of a major naval base at Singapore, as W. E. Bridgeman, First Lord of the Admiralty, submitted a budget request for 60.5 million British pounds (equivalent at the time to $289,190,000) to the House of Commons for approval.
- Died: Nariman Narimanov, 54, Azerbaijani novelist, playwright, Bolshevik revolutionary and Chairman of the Council of People's Commissars of the Azerbaijani SSR in 1921 and 1922; died of a heart attack (b. 1870)

== March 20, 1925 (Friday) ==
- Pierre Prüm formed a cabinet of ministers to become the new Prime Minister of Luxembourg.
- Clifton R. Wharton, American diplomat and the first African American to be admitted to the United States Foreign Service, began a career that would lead to him being (in 1958) the first black U.S. envoy to Romania and (in 1961) the first black U.S. Ambassador to Norway.
- Boxer Charlie "Phil" Rosenberg defeated defending champion Eddie "Cannonball" Martin in a 15-round unanimous decision, becoming the new World Bantamweight Champion.
- The documentary film Grass, following the Bakhtiari tribe of Persia, was released.
- Born:
  - Günter Discher, German disc jockey; in Eimsbüttel, Hamburg, Germany (d. 2012)
  - Romana Acosta Bañuelos, Treasurer of the United States from 1971 to 1974; in Miami, Arizona, United States (d. 2018)
- Died: Lord Curzon, 66, British politician, served as Viceroy of British India from 1899 to 1905, Secretary of State for Foreign Affairs from 1919 to 1924, and Leader of the House of Lords from 1916 until his death; died following surgery for a severe hemorrhage of the bladder (b. 1859)

== March 21, 1925 (Saturday) ==
- In Spain, the Commonwealth of Catalonia (Mancomunitat de Catalunya), governed by a deliberative assembly of 96 councilors of the four Catalan provinces (Barcelona, Tarragona, Girona and Lleida) and presided over by Governor Alfonso Sala, was dissolved by Spanish Prime Minister Miguel Primo de Rivera. The Mancomunitat had been created in 1913 after King Alfonso XIII had signed a law granting all Spanish provinces the right to group themselves into associations or commonwealths.
- Arturo Alessandri returned from exile to retake office as president of Chile, ending the January Junta led by Emilio Bello Codesido.
- In the U.S. state of Tennessee, the Butler Act, prohibiting school teachers from denying the Biblical account of man's origin, took effect as it was signed by Governor Austin Peay. The Act, which provided that "it shall be unlawful for any teacher in any of the Universities, Normals and all other public schools of the State which are supported in whole or in part by the public school funds of the State, to teach any theory that denies the Story of the Divine Creation of man as taught in the Bible, and to teach instead that man has descended from a lower order of animals," had been passed by the state House of Representatives, 71 to 5 and by the Tennessee Senate, 24 to 6. The Act would remain on the books until its appeal on May 17, 1967.
- The Board of Regents of the University of California, Los Angeles (UCLA) announced that they had selected a 383 acres (155 ha) site at Westwood, adjacent to Beverly Hills as the site for a new campus. The property, which would still house the UCLA campus 100 years later, was purchased from the Janss Brothers for almost one million dollars. Construction would begin on May 7, 1928.
- In Germany, Franz Xaver Schwarz became the Reichsschatzmeister (National Treasurer) of the Nazi Party, a position he held for more than 20 years until the conquest of Germany on May 8, 1945.
- The first performance of the Maurice Ravel opera ballet L'enfant et les sortilèges was conducted in Monte Carlo.
- Born: Peter Brook, British theatre and film director; in Chiswick, England (d. 2022)

== March 22, 1925 (Sunday) ==
- The first radio broadcast in Japan was made, transmitted by the Tokyo Broadcasting Station. The first broadcast started with a performance by the Japanese Navy Band, a news program, and a recording of Ludwig van Beethoven's opera Fidelio.
- Three high-ranking Soviet intelligence agency officials – Georgi Atarbekov, 34; Solomon Mogilevsky, 39, and Aleksandr Myasnikyan, 39, were killed in the explosion of a Junkers F 13 airplane, along with the pilot and the flight engineer. The aircraft caught fire shortly after departing from Tiflis in the Georgian SSR to Sukhumi, where they were to attend a Communist Party conference.
- The soccer football national teams of Haiti and Jamaica made their international debut, playing each other in the a three-game series in the Haitian capital of Port-au-Prince. Jamaica won the opener, 2 to 1, and the other two games (3 to 0 on March 26 and 1 to 0 on March 29).
- Women's tuxedos were reported as the newest fashion rage in Paris.
- Born: Gerard Hoffnung, German-born British artist and musician; in Berlin, Weimar Republic (present-day Germany) (d. 1959)

== March 23, 1925 (Monday) ==
- Parliamentary elections were held in Egypt. The Wafd Party, led by former Prime Minister Saad Zaghloul had had 188 of the 215 seats, and lost 102 of them to a collection of other parties and independents.
- The Venezuelan financial institution Mercantil Banco was founded in Caracas as "Banco Neerlando Venezolano" by a group of 98 Venezuelan businessmen. It would begin operations 11 days later.
- In Rome, Benito Mussolini made his first public appearance in over a month when he briefly spoke at a celebration commemorating the sixth anniversary of the Fasci Italiani da Combattimento. There had been much speculation as to the state of his health during his long absence.
- Born:
  - David Watkin, British cinematographer and winner of the 1985 Academy Award for Best Cinematography for his work on the film Out of Africa; in Margate, Kent, England (d. 2008)
  - Monica Sinclair, British operatic contralto; in Evercreech, Somerset, England (d. 2002)
  - Uiliami Leilua Vi, Tongan nobleman, musician and nose-flute player; in Nuku'alofa, Kingdom of Tonga (d. 1986)

== March 24, 1925 (Tuesday) ==
- The Red Pen, the first "radio opera" to be written specifically for broadcast, made its debut on BBC Radio. The two-act operetta had been composed by Geoffrey Toye to a libretto by A. P. Herbert.
- World Animal Day, now celebrated annually on October 4, was first staged by German zoologist and dog specialist Heinrich Zimmermann, with over 5,000 people attending at the Berlin Sport Palace. Starting in 1929, World Animal Day would be moved to coincide with the feast day of Saint Francis of Assisi.
- Born: Kazi Nuruzzaman; Bangladeshi commander of the Mukti Bahini independence fighters in the 1971 Bangladesh Liberation War; in Chuchura, Bengal Province, British India (present-day West Bengal, India) (d. 2011)

== March 25, 1925 (Wednesday) ==
- In a precursor to television, Scottish inventor John Logie Baird publicly demonstrated the transmission of moving silhouette pictures at the London department store Selfridges. A contemporary report in Nature magazine on three weeks of demonstrations noted that Baird had shown "an experimental apparatus of his own design for wireless 'television' (i.e. the simultaneous reproduction at a distance of an image of a fixed or moving object)" and that "we have seen the production in the receiver of a recognisable, if rather blurred, image of simple forms, such as letters painted in white on a black card, held up before the transmitter... the object, strongly illuminated, is placed opposite a revolving disc provided with a series of lenses, each a little nearer to the centre than the last, which project a series of moving images upon a selenium or other photo-electric cell, each a little displaced laterally from the last," and added "In the receiving section of Mr. Baird's television apparatus, the signals sent out from the transmitter are detected and amplified by very powerful valves until they are strong eneough to light up a neon tube when a signal is received."
- Born:
  - Flannery O'Connor, American novelist; as Mary Flannery O'Connor, in Savannah, Georgia, United States (d. 1964)
  - K. S. Ashwath, Indian actor in Kannada cinema in 370 films, including Doorada Betta; as Karaganahalli Subbaraya Ashwathanarayana, in Holenarasipura, Kingdom of Mysore, British India (present-day Hassan, Karnataka, India) (d. 2010).

== March 26, 1925 (Thursday) ==
- A fistfight broke out in the Italian Chamber of Deputies. Upon Benito Mussolini's return to the Chamber after an absence of 40 days, Fascists cheered and sang "Giovinezza", while the Communists countered with "The Internationale". Fascists rushed the Communist benches and punches were exchanged until the Communists left the Chamber and order was restored.
- Germany announced that holders of German war bonds would receive a refund of 5 percent of their original investment. Winners of a lottery would receive a refund of up to 25 percent.
- The British armed merchant cruiser HMS Rawalpindi was launched.
- Born:
  - Julian J. Bussgang, Polish-born American mathematician known for the Bussgang theorem, founder of the signal processing firm Signatron Inc.; in Lwow, Poland (present-day Lviv, Ukraine) (d. 2023)
  - Pierre Boulez, French composer and conductor; in Montbrison, Loire, France (d. 2016)
- Died: Hugo Bettauer, 52, Austrian writer and journalist; died 17 days after being shot multiple times by a Nazi assassin, Otto Rothstock (b. 1872)

== March 27, 1925 (Friday) ==
- Double Chase won the 84th Grand National steeplechase horse race at Aintree Racecourse near Liverpool.
- James "Red" Herring won boxing's World Junior Welterweight Title in a controversial decision over Pinky Mitchell. The bout in Detroit ended when referee Slim McClelland enforced a regulation that disqualified a person weighing more that the limit of 140 pounds (64 kg) for the light welterweight division, given that Mitchell weighed 146 pounds (66 kg).

== March 28, 1925 (Saturday) ==
- In the U.S., the National Speech and Debate Association (NSDA) was founded in Wisconsin by Ripon College professor Bruno E. Jacob, originally as the National Forensic League (NFL). On May 17, 2013, the organization would change its name, explaining that "As a communication organization, we need to effectively communicate who we are and what we do. There is a common misunderstanding of 'NFL' or 'forensics,' including confusion with the National Football League or crime scene investigation; changing our name to focus on the activity of speech and debate will appeal to more students, coaches, alumni, sponsors, and the general public."
- The remains of U.S. Admiral George Dewey were disinterred from Arlington National Cemetery and moved to the Washington National Cathedral, next to the tomb of Woodrow Wilson.
- In Princes Risborough, Buckinghamshire in England, the original Kop Hill Climb was run for the last time after having started in 1910 as a 903 yards (826 m) climb by automobiles up a public road on a steep hill. After an automobile ran off the road and broke a spectator's leg, the Royal Automobile Club (R.A.C.) and the Auto-Cycle Union (A.C.U.) announced that they would issue no further permits for speed competitions on public roads. The event would be revived more than 70 years later, in 1999.
- The University of Cambridge won the 77th annual Boat Race.
- Died:
  - Henry Rawlinson, 1st Baron Rawlinson, 61, British Army General during World War I, and served as Commander-in-Chief, India from 1920 until his death; died following surgery for a stomach ailment (b. 1864)
  - John Jacob Rogers, 43, American lawyer and politician, served as the U.S. Representative for Massachusetts from 1913 until his death; died of Hodgkins' disease (b. 1881). His widow, Edith Nourse Rogers, was elected to complete the remainder of his term and served for 35 years until her death in 1960.

== March 29, 1925 (Sunday) ==
- The German presidential election was held to choose a successor to Friedrich Ebert, who died in office February 28. Karl Jarres came in first with 38.8% of the vote, but because no candidate won a majority a run-off election was set for April 26.
- Japan's Diet passed the Universal Manhood Suffrage Law, expanding voting rights to 4 million citizens who were previously barred from voting on account of their dependence on public or private assistance for their livelihood.
- Born: Bobby Hutchins, American child film actor known for portraying "Wheezer" in the Our Gang short films; as Robert Hutchins, in Tacoma, Washington, United States (d. 1945, killed in plane crash)
- Died: Bajram Curri, 63, Albanian politician who fought for Albanian independence from the Ottoman Empire; killed by troops who backed President Ahmet Zogu while hiding near Dragobia (b. 1862)

== March 30, 1925 (Monday) ==
- The Victoria Cougars defeated the Montreal Canadiens, 6 to 1, to win the Stanley Cup of ice hockey, three games to one. The Cougars, champions of the six-team Western Canada Hockey League (WHCL), were the last non-NHL team to win the Cup.
- Explorer Donald Baxter MacMillan urged U.S. President Coolidge to send ships into the Arctic in search of undiscovered lands to claim for the United States.
- The sudden flooding of the Montagu View Colliery at Newcastle upon Tyne killed 38 coal miners.
- Born: Jo Decker, American rodeo competitor and inductee of the National Rodeo Hall of Fame; as Jo Ramsey, in San Angelo, Texas, United States (d. 2010)
- Died: Rudolf Steiner, 64, Austrian philosopher and author of The Philosophy of Freedom; died after a long illness (b. 1861)

== March 31, 1925 (Tuesday) ==
- The collapse of a pontoon bridge in Germany killed 67 soldiers of the Reichswehr who drowned while crossing over the Weser river near Minden. Later reporting alleged that the casualties were over 200 and the German military was conducting experiments with a new river-crossing system.
- The Kingdom of Iran adopted the Solar Hijri calendar that would be in use 100 years later, reviving the ancient Persian calendar names. The new calendar switched from the lunar calendar used in Islamic nations, though it kept the Islamic calendar system of dating the first year from the 662 AD, when Muhammad migrate from Mecca to Medina. The first day of each year on the Iranian calendar was March 21 (1 Farvardin 1304), and the year consisted of 365 days (366 in leap years), with the first six months (Farvardin, Ordībehešt, Khordad, Tir, Amordad, and Shahrivar) having 31 days, the next five (Mehr, Aban, Azar, Dey, and Bahman) having 30, and the twelfth (Esfand) having 29 days or 30 in leap years.
- The Philadelphia Daily News began publication as a tabloid morning paper.
- Sergei M. Eisenstein began filming of the classic Soviet film Battleship Potemkin on the streets of Leningrad.
- Born: Leonard Andrews, American art collector known for preserving the works of Andrew Wyeth; in Nacogdoches, Texas, United States (d. 2009)
