= May 1925 =

Month of 1925

<<	May 1925					>>
Su	Mo	Tu	We	Th	Fr	Sa
					1	2
3	4	5	6	7	8	9
10	11	12	13	14	15	16
17	18	19	20	21	22	23
24	25	26	27	28	29	30
31

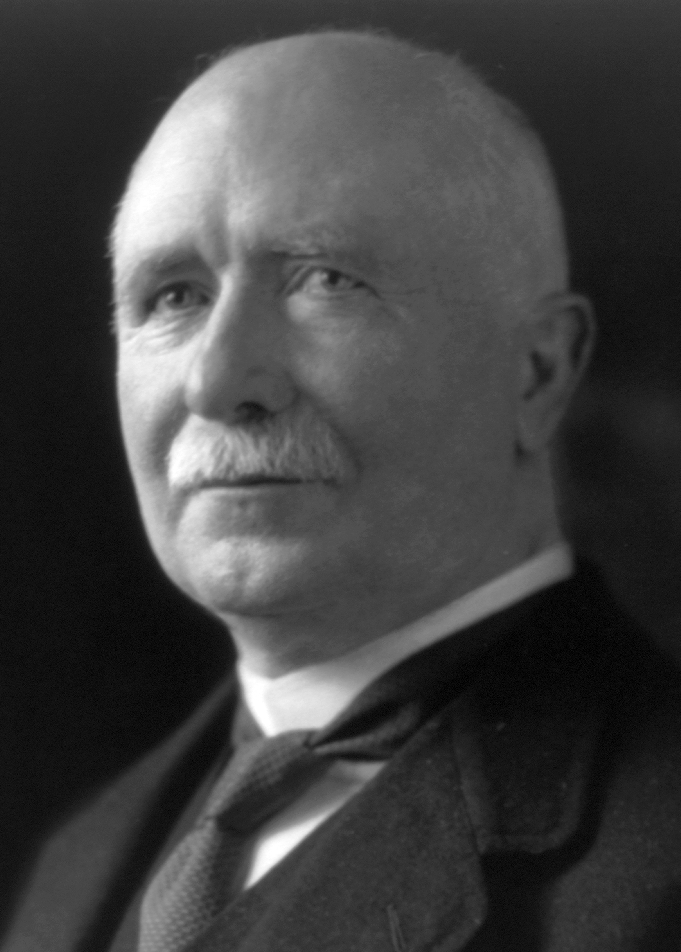
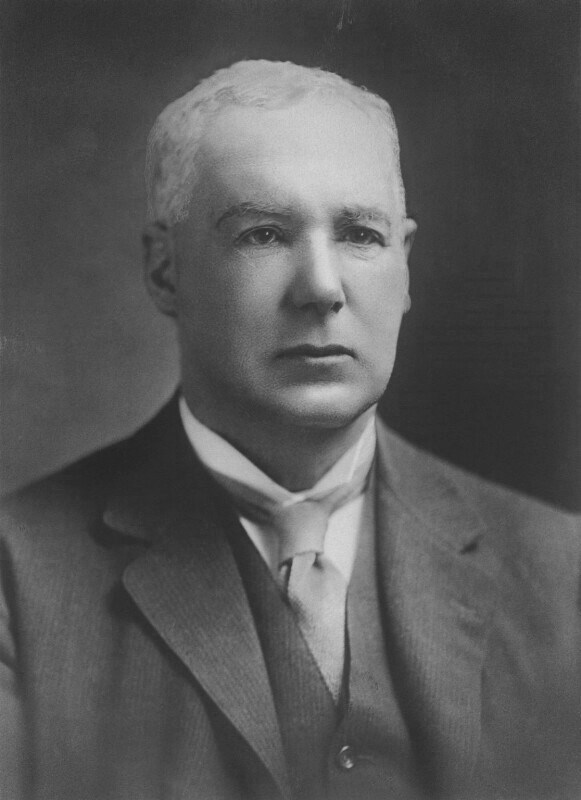
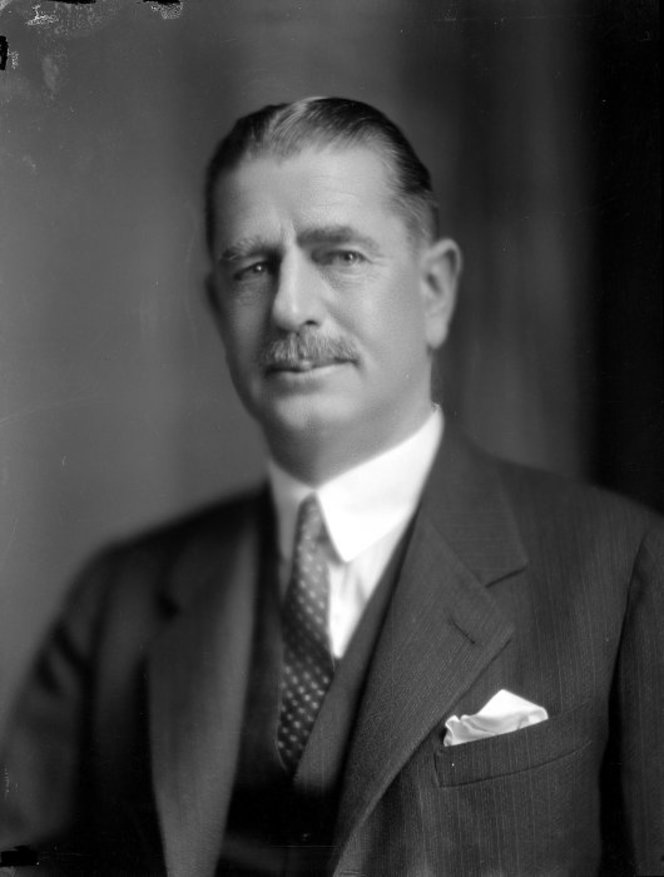
New Zealand has three prime ministers in the same month — William Massey (May 1–10), Francis Bell (May 14–30) and Gordon Coates (May 30–31)

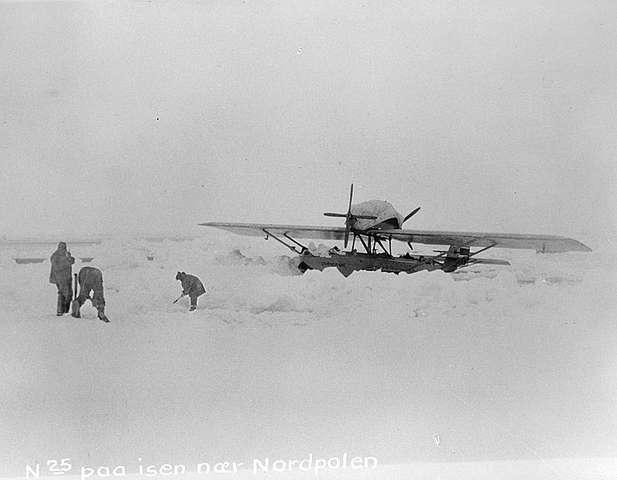
May 22, 1925: Amundsen expedition airplanes set record for furthest north travel, get stranded in the Arctic

The following events occurred in May 1925:

== May 1, 1925 (Friday) ==
- The All-China Federation of Trade Unions, now the world's largest trade union organization with 134 million members, was founded in Guangzhou in the Republic of China.
- Cyprus became a British crown colony.
- "Pink's War", a British aerial bombardment campaign against the rebellious Mahsud tribe in South Waziristan in British India's Punjab Province (now Pakistan), came to an end 53 days after it had been started by RAF Air Commodore Richard Pink on March 9.
- The Manifesto of the Anti-Fascist Intellectuals ("Manifesto degli intellettuali antifascisti"), written by Benedetto Croce was published in the Rome newspaper il Mondo.
- The Adonistic Society was founded in Vienna to spread the polytheistic religion of Adonism, which postulates five principal gods.
- Barcelona Sporting Club (B.S.C.), one of the most successful fútbol teams in Ecuador, was founded by Eutimio Pérez, an immigrant from Spain who had lived in Barcelona.
- Born:
  - Scott Carpenter, American astronaut, member of the Mercury Seven selected for Project Mercury and was the fourth astronaut to orbit the Earth; as Malcolm Scott Carpenter, in Boulder, Colorado, United States (d. 2013)
  - Gabriele Amorth, Italian Catholic priest and exorcist, co-founder of the International Association of Exorcists; in Modena, Kingdom of Italy (present-day Italy) (d. 2016)
  - Anna May Hutchison, American professional baseball player in the AAGPBL, as a pitcher she had the most games won and innings pitched in the 1947 season; in Louisville, Kentucky (d. 1998)

== May 2, 1925 (Saturday) ==
- Elections were held in Bolivia for the President and for the Chamber of Deputies. The Partido Republicano won all 70 seats in the Chamber of Deputies and Jose Cabino Villeneuva was elected president, receiving almost 85% of the vote against Daniel Salamanca. Although Villanueva was to be inaugurated on August 5, outgoing President Bautista Saavedra, dissatisfied that Gabino would obey his wishes, asked the Bolivian National Congress to postpone the transition to August 25, and then to nullify the results. On September 1, the Congress then voted to annul the election, named Senate President Felipe Segundo Guzmán to serve as acting president, and scheduling new elections for January 10. As grounds, President Saavedra noted that Villanueva had continued to serve as the president's Minister of Public Instruction, violating an 1895 law that required candidates to resign from public office at least six months before an election.
- It was announced that King Alexander of Yugoslavia had signed a decree to have his brother Prince George interned as mentally incompetent.
- The city of Bradentown in the U.S. state of Florida, had its name changed to "Bradenton" with the signing of a bill by Governor John W. Martin.
- The Hull Kingston Rovers defeated the Swinton Lions, 9 to 5, to win the Northern Rugby Football League championship in England.
- A U.S. Navy seaplane set a new record by staying airborne for 28-and-a-half hours.
- Kezar Stadium opened in San Francisco.
- Born:
  - Roscoe Lee Browne, American actor and director; in Woodbury, New Jersey, United States (d. 2007)
  - Inga Gill, Swedish actress; in Stockholm, Sweden (d. 2000)
  - John Neville, English actor and theater director; as John Reginald Neville, in Willesden, London, England (d. 2011)
- Died:
  - Johann Palisa, 76, Austrian astronomer (b. 1848)
  - Antun Branko Šimić, 26, Croatian poet; died of tuberculosis (b. 1898)

== May 3, 1925 (Sunday) ==
- The groundbreaking ceremony was held for the Washington, D.C. Jewish Community Center. President Calvin Coolidge addressed the event, stating, "The Jewish faith is predominantly the faith of liberty."
- Born: Robert Jonquet, French footballer with 58 caps for the France national team; in Paris, France (d. 2008)

== May 4, 1925 (Monday) ==
- The Geneva Arms Conference began in Switzerland, seeking an international arms limitation agreement.
- Swains Island, with an area of 0.94 square miles and a population of about 100 people, was annexed by the U.S. as part of the territory of American Samoa.
- At the age of 64, coach James Naismith, the Canadian-born inventor of the sport of basketball, became a U.S. citizen 35 years after he had moved to the United States.
- Born:
  - Maurice R. Greenberg, American business executive; in New York City, United States
  - Olive Osmond, matriarch of the Osmond singing family; as Olive Davis, in Samaria, Idaho, United States (d. 2004)

== May 5, 1925 (Tuesday) ==
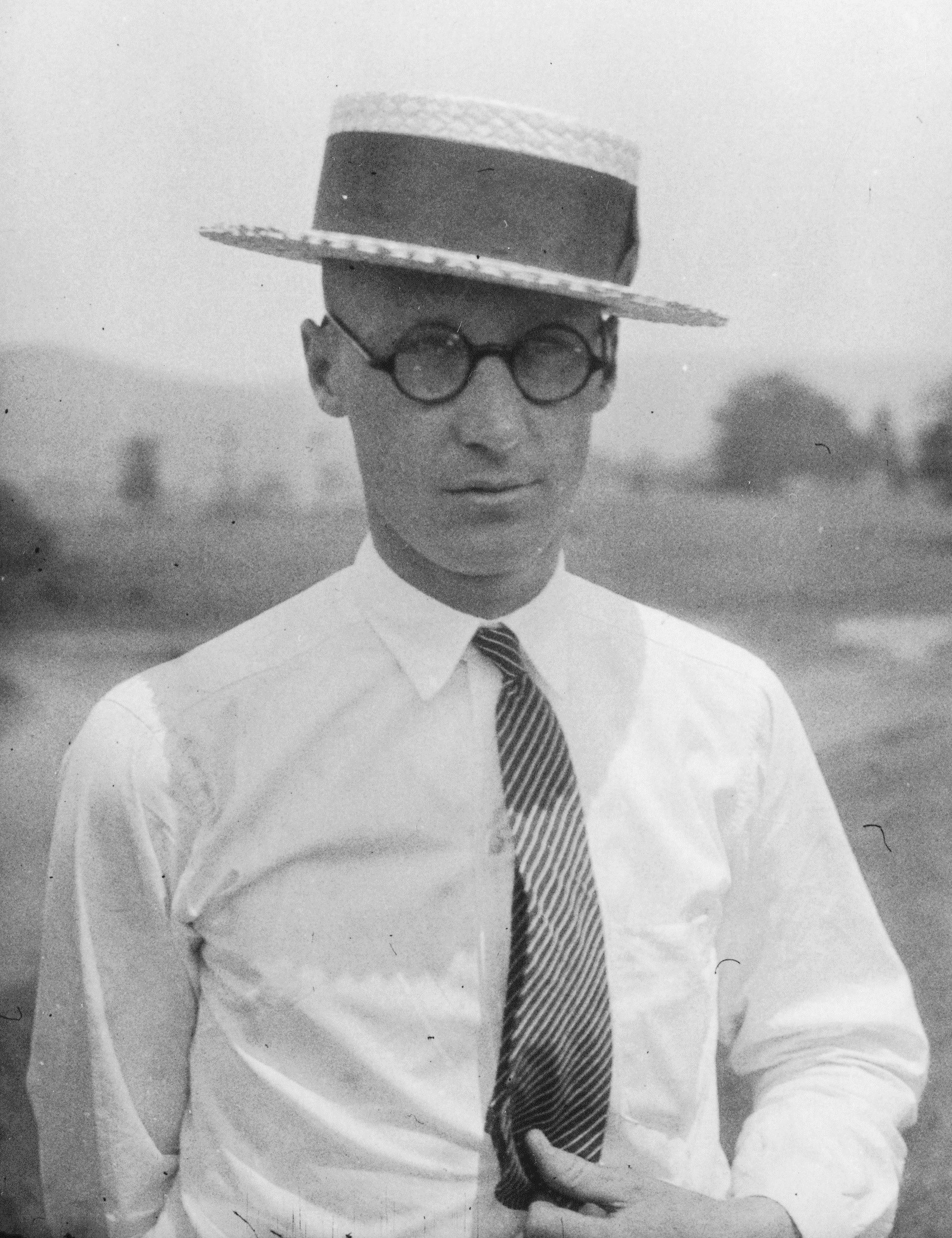
John T. Scopes

- In Dayton, Tennessee, Dayton City School biology teacher John T. Scopes was arrested after teaching evolution from a chapter in the textbook Civic Biology, in a violation of a new Tennessee state law. The arrest was carried out by Rhea County Deputy Sheriff S. P. Swafford. Scopes was released on May 9 after a bail bond of $1,000 was posted on his behalf.
- The General Election Law was passed in Japan.
- Born: Charles Chaplin Jr., American actor, son of actors Charlie Chaplin and Lita Grey; in Beverly Hills, California, United States (d. 1968)

== May 6, 1925 (Wednesday) ==
- The government of the Kingdom of Romania passed the "Statute on the organization of the Romanian Orthodox Church", a comprehensive set of regulations for every aspect of the Eastern European nation's official church.
- The Wilno school massacre occurred in Wilno in Poland (now Vilnius) in Lithuania when a pair of eighth-grade students, Stanislaw Lawrynowicz and Janusz Obrąpalski attacked teachers during final exams. Nine students and the school principal were wounded, and two students and a teacher were killed. Lawrynowicz, who carried a hand grenade as well as a pistol, exploded the grenade during a struggle over his gun, killing himself and two students, Tadeusz Domański and Aleksander Zahorski. Obrapalski shot teacher Jan Jankowski, fatally wounding him, and then killed himself.
- Baseball player Everett Scott of the New York Yankees, who had a record of 1,307 consecutive games dating back to June 20, 1916, saw his streak come to an end as Yankees manager Miller Huggins benched him. Scott was placed on waivers by Huggins at the end of the month. Scott's record would stand for several more years until being broken by Lou Gehrig.
- Born: Hédi Temessy, Hungarian actress; as Hedvig Temesi, in Budapest, Kingdom of Hungary (present-day Hungary) (d. 2001)

== May 7, 1925 (Thursday) ==
- Glenn Wright, shortstop for baseball's Pittsburgh Pirates, became the fifth Major League Baseball player to accomplish the rare unassisted triple play. Wright's feat of causing three outs in a single play occurred in the 9th inning of a game against the St. Louis Cardinals. Wright caught a line drive hit by Jim Bottomley, reached second base before a Roger Hornsby could arrive from first, and Glenn Wright out as Wright was returning to base. Despite the feat, Wright's Pirates lost to the Cardinals, 10 to 9.
- The Key Club, a youth organization for the Kiwanis Club, was founded, with the first chapter opening in Sacramento, California.
- Died:
  - William Hesketh Lever, 73, English industrialist, philanthropist and politician (b. 1851)
  - Doveton Sturdee, 65, British admiral of the Royal Navy (b. 1859)

== May 8, 1925 (Friday) ==
- The capsizing and sinking of the steamboat M.E. Norman on the Mississippi River near Memphis, Tennessee killed 23 passengers and crew, although the death toll would have been higher had it not been for the rescues made by Tom Lee, an African-American riverworker, who came to the aid of survivors using his small motorboat, Zev, to save 32 passengers. Another 20 were able to swim to shore.
- Macedonian revolutionary Mencha Karnicheva assassinated Bulgarian activist Todor Panitsa, a leader of the Internal Macedonian Revolutionary Organization terrorist group, by shooting him at the Vienna Burgtheater. Karnicheva acted on her own in deciding to get revenge on Panitsa for killing other IMRO officials.
- The Official Languages Act was passed in South Africa, placing Afrikaans on the same level as English as one of the two official languages of the Union of South Africa. The Act also recognized Afrikaans as a distinct language, rather than as a dialect of Dutch.
- The Preakness Stakes, now the second jewel of the American Triple Crown of Thoroughbred Racing, was run at Pimlico Race Course in Baltimore eight days sooner than the Kentucky Derby. Despite the short time between the two races, six of the 12 entrants at the Preakness (Backbone and Almadel, who finished first and second, and Voltaic, Single Foot, Prince of Bourbon and Swope) would run in the Kentucky Derby.
- Jockey Benny Marinelli, who had won the 1923 Preakness Stakes, was seriously injured in a racing accident at the Jamaica Race Course in Jamaica, New York. Marinelli was riding the horse "Upton" when he was thrown from his mount, then struck in the head by another horse. Marinelli surprised doctors 10 days later by recovering consciousness, and returned to horse racing, but was unable to return to his previous success. He would commit suicide two years later.
- Born: Ali Hassan Mwinyi, Tanzanian politician who served as the second President of Tanzania from 1985 to 1995; in Kivure, Tanganyika Territory (present-day Tanzania) (d. 2024)

== May 9, 1925 (Saturday) ==
- The Tungus Republic, which had seceded from the Yakut Autonomous Soviet Socialist Republic within Russia on July 14, 1924, brought an end to its war against the Soviet Union as the secessionist leader Mikhail Artemyev and his soldiers surrendered in return for amnesty. Artemyev would be permitted freedom until joining another rebel movement in 1927. Recaptured, he would be executed for treason on March 27, 1928.
- Keats House, which once belonged to the Romantic poet John Keats, was opened to the public.
- Born: Roy Pritchard, English footballer; in Dawley, Shropshire, England (d. 1993)

== May 10, 1925 (Sunday) ==
- FC Barcelona beat Arenas Club, 2 to 0 in the 1925 Copa del Rey Final in Spain.
- William Massey, Prime Minister of New Zealand since 1912, died from cancer. He was succeeded by Francis Bell until his Reform Party could meet to select a new leader.
- Born:
  - Sugako Hashida, Japanese screenwriter; in Keijyo, Chōsen (present-day Seoul, South Korea) (d. 2021)
  - Rolf Rendtorff, German Biblical scholar; in Preetz, Schleswig-Holstein, Free State of Prussia (present-day Germany) (d. 2014)
- Died: Alexandru Marghiloman, 70, Romanian politician who served briefly as Prime Minister of Romania for seven months in 1918 (b. 1854)

== May 11, 1925 (Monday) ==
- The romantic comedy film Eve's Secret was released.
- Étoile Sportive du Sahel (ESS), one of the most successful teams in Tunisia's premier soccer football league, Ligue 1, was founded in Sousse.
- Born: Max Morlock, German footballer; as Maximilian Morlock, in Nuremberg, Germany (d. 1994)
- Died: May King Van Rensselaer, 76, American author and historian who was instrumental in founding the Museum of the City of New York (b. 1848)

== May 12, 1925 (Tuesday) ==
- Paul von Hindenburg was sworn in for a seven-year term as President of Germany. His inaugural address emphasized the need to place unity and mutual progress ahead of political partisanship. Hindenburg would win an election for a second term at the age of 84 in 1932, and die in office in 1934.
- In New York City, the Brooklyn Bridge reopened to motor traffic for the first time in almost three years, after having been closed since July 6, 1922 because of problems with two suspension cables.
- William Jennings Bryan agreed to participate in a trial of John Scopes on the side of the prosecution, ensuring great national interest.
- American serial killer Martha Wise was convicted of murder after having poisoned 17 members of her family, three of whom died. She was sentenced to life imprisonment. With the exception of three days in 1962 when she had a commutation of her sentence, Mrs. Wise would remain in prison for the rest of her life, dying in 1971.
- Born: Yogi Berra, American professional baseball player; as Lorenzo Pietro Berra, in St. Louis, Missouri, United States (d. 2015)
- Died:
  - Amy Lowell, 51, American imagist poet and member of the Lowell family (b. 1874)
  - Charles Mangin, 58, French general during World War I (b. 1866)

== May 13, 1925 (Wednesday) ==
- The Turkmen Soviet Socialist Republic and the Uzbek Soviet Socialist Republic were created in the Soviet Union after being elevated by the Soviet government from autonomous status to full republics. Now the nations of Turkmenistan and Uzbekistan, the two were among the 15 republics of the Soviet Union upon its breakup in 1991.
- Aloys Van de Vyvere became Prime Minister of Belgium
- The Gold Standard Act 1925 was given royal assent by King George V in Britain, officially returning the country to the gold standard.
- Died: Alfred Milner, 1st Viscount Milner, 71, British statesman and colonial administrator, served as the Governor of the Cape Colony from 1897 to 1901, Governor of the Transvaal and the Orange River Colony from 1901 to 1905), Secretary of State for War from 1918 to 1919, and as Secretary of State for the Colonies from 1919 to 1921; died of African trypanosomiasis.

== May 14, 1925 (Thursday) ==
- The French captured Bibane Height in the Rif War.
- The novel Mrs Dalloway by Virginia Woolf was published.
- Born:
  - Sophie Kurys, American professional baseball player in the All-American Girls Professional Baseball League; in Flint, Michigan, United States (d. 2013)
  - Les Moss, American professional baseball player in the MLB; as John Lester Moss, in Tulsa, Oklahoma, United States (d. 2012)
  - Patrice Munsel, American soprano singer; as Patrice Munsil, in Spokane, Washington, United States (d. 2016)
- Died: H. Rider Haggard, 68, English novelist (b. 1856)

== May 15, 1925 (Friday) ==
- U.S. president Calvin Coolidge ruled out prohibitionist Wayne Wheeler's plan to use the U.S. Navy to enforce the Volstead Act, believing the navy's purpose should only be for national defense and not police duty.
- Editorials in the Japanese press decried American plans to strengthen the naval base at Pearl Harbor, as such plans either suggested fear of Japanese aggression towards America or American aggression towards Japan.
- Al-Insaniyyah, the first Arabic communist newspaper, was founded.
- Died: Nelson A. Miles, 85, American U.S. Army general who served in the American Civil War, American Indian Wars, and the Spanish–American War; died from a heart attack (b. 1838)

== May 16, 1925 (Saturday) ==
- Flying Ebony won the Kentucky Derby.
- The first modern performance of Claudio Monteverdi's opera Il ritorno d'Ulisse in patria occurred in Paris.
- Born: Nílton Santos, Brazilian footballer; in Rio de Janeiro, Brazil (d. 2013)
- Died: Selden P. Spencer, 62, American lawyer and politician, served as the U.S. Senator from Missouri from 1918 until his death; died of complications from surgery for a hernia (b. 1862)

== May 17, 1925 (Sunday) ==
- Thérèse of Lisieux was canonized as a saint less than 28 years after her 1897 death from tuberculosis.
- Some 15,000 people demonstrated in Bucharest against the Brătianu government.
- The Richard Rodgers and Lorenz Hart revue The Garrick Gaieties opened on Broadway.
- Baseball player Tris Speaker of the Cleveland Indians became the fifth player to accomplish the feat of making 3,000 hits in his career.
- Baseball pitcher Buster Ross of the Boston Red Sox set a record, still standing after almost a century, by committing four errors in a single game. His dubious honor came while he played against the St. Louis Browns.
- Died: Josiah Dallas Dort, 64, American automobile manufacturer, founder of the Dort Motor Car Company (b. 1861)

== May 18, 1925 (Monday) ==
- Alfonso XIII of Spain signed a decree ending martial law in Spain, which had been imposed in September 1923.

== May 19, 1925 (Tuesday) ==
- Casey Stengel played in his final major league baseball game. The Boston Braves released him one day later, ending his fourteen-season playing career.
- Born:
  - Malcolm X, American civil rights activist and Muslim minister who became a prominent figure during the civil rights movement; as Malcolm Little, in Omaha, Nebraska, United States (d. 1965, assassinated)
  - Pol Pot, Cambodian Khmer Rouge politician and dictator who ruled over Democratic Kampuchea from 1975 to 1979 and oversaw the Cambodian genocide; as Saloth Sâr, in Prek Sbauv, Kampong Thom province, French Indochina (present-day Cambodia) (d. 1998)

== May 20, 1925 (Wednesday) ==
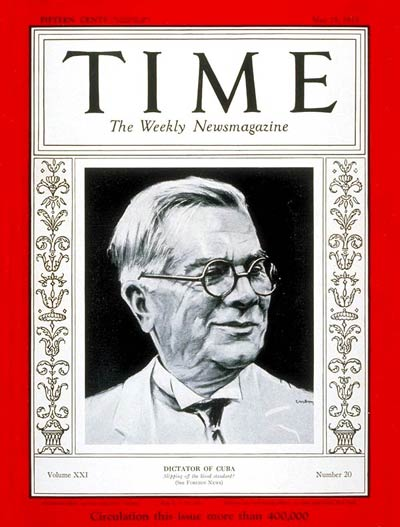
Cuban President Gerardo Machado

- Gerardo Machado was sworn into office as the new President of Cuba, after having won the November 1, 1924 presidential election.
- The Murrumbidgee River flooded in Australia, killing eight people.
- Born: Aleksey Tupolev, Soviet and Russian aircraft designer whose developments included the Tupolev Tu-134 twin-engined jet airliner and the supersonic Tupolev Tu-144, and son of aeronautical engineer Andrei Tupolev; in Moscow, Russian SFSR, Soviet Union (present-day Russia) (d. 2001)
- Died:
  - Joseph Howard, 62, Maltese politician, served as the first Prime Minister of Malta from 1921 to 1923 (b. 1862)
  - Elias M. Ammons, 64, American politician, served as the Governor of Colorado from 1913 to 1915, and is known for ordering National Guard troops into Ludlow, Colorado during the Colorado Coalfield War, which resulted in the Ludlow Massacre (b. 1860)

== May 21, 1925 (Thursday) ==
- In an expedition directed by explorer Roald Amundsen, two specially-equipped seaplanes (the N24 and N25) took off from Kings Bay (now Ny-Ålesund) in Svalbard, Norway in an attempt to be the first to fly to the North Pole.
- Legal 4.4 beer went on sale in the Canadian province of Ontario, triggering an influx of visitors from bordering U.S. states.
- Died: Hidesaburō Ueno, 53, Japanese agricultural scientist and guardian of Hachikō (b. 1872)

== May 22, 1925 (Friday) ==
- Unsure of their position, experiencing engine trouble and with half their fuel used up, the crew of the N25 airplane touched down on the ice 150 miles (240 km) short of the North Pole. The N24 spotted their predicament and landed as well. The Amundsen Polar Expedition group from the two planes, stopped at latitude 87°43' North, had traveled further north than any humans in history, but were stranded and would spend the next 24 days trying to chisel a primitive runway to take off again.
- Constantine VI resigned from his job as the Ecumenical Patriarch of Constantinople, the spiritual leader of the Eastern Orthodox Christian Church. Constantine, who had held the job for only five months, would be replaced by the Archbishop Vasileios Georgiadis in July.
- Born:
  - James King, American tenor singer; in Dodge City, Kansas, United States (d. 2005)
  - Jean Tinguely, Swiss artist; in Fribourg, Switzerland (d. 1991)
  - Tony Andruzzi, American stage magician; as Timothy McGuire, in Cheyenne, Wyoming, United States (d. 1991)
- Died:
  - John French, 1st Earl of Ypres, 72, British Army officer, served as the Commander-in-Chief, Home Forces of the British Expeditionary Force during World War I; died from bladder cancer (b. 1852)
  - Willie Park Jr., 61, Scottish professional golfer, winner of the British Open in 1887 and 1889 (b. 1864)

== May 23, 1925 (Saturday) ==
- A 6.8 magnitude earthquake killed 428 people in Japan and injured over 1,000 others, and destroyed more than 7,800 buildings and 45,000 houses, primarily in the town of Toyooka in the Hyōgo Prefecture. The quake struck at 11:11 in the morning local time.
- Born:
  - Joshua Lederberg, American molecular biologist, recipient of the Nobel Prize in Physiology or Medicine; in Montclair, New Jersey, United States (d. 2008)
  - Henry Wolf, Austrian-born American photographer and recipient of the American Institute of Graphic Arts Medal for Lifetime Achievement; in Vienna, Austria (d. 2005)
- Died: Sir Edward Hulton, 56, British newspaper proprietor and thoroughbred racehorse owner; died of an undisclosed illness (b. 1869)

== May 24, 1925 (Sunday) ==
- Voters in Switzerland overwhelmingly rejected the "Rothenberger initiative", a form of retirement social security payments for elderly people. The vote required a "double majority", a majority of the popular votes as well as a majority of Switzerland's 22 cantons. The proposal was supported by only 42% of the registered voters, and only six of the cantons.
- The Lens war monument by French sculptor Augustin Lesieux was inaugurated in Lens, Pas-de-Calais.
- The Bulgarian football club FC Vihren Sandanski was founded
- The Argentine football club Leandro N. Alem was founded.
- The Soviet Russian newspaper Komsomolskaya Pravda, intended for members of Komsomol, the youth organization of the Soviet Communist Party, published its first issue.
- Born: Mai Zetterling, Swedish actress and film director; in Västerås, Sweden (d. 1994)

== May 25, 1925 (Monday) ==
- A nova in the variable star RR Pictoris was first seen from the Earth, at least 1,644 years after it had happened in the 3rd century AD. A telegraph operator who was an amateur astronomer, Robert Watson of Beaufort West in South Africa first observed a bright star not previously visible in the Pictoris constellation. RR Pictoris continued to get brighter, reaching its peak magnitude 15 days later on June 9.
- High school teacher John Scopes was indicted by the Rhea County grand jury in Dayton, Tennessee, for violation of the state's anti-evolution law.
- Born:
  - Jeanne Crain, American actress; in Barstow, California, United States (d. 2003)
  - José María Gatica, Argentine boxer; in Villa Mercedes, San Luis, Argentina (d. 1963)

== May 26, 1925 (Tuesday) ==
- International plans were drawn up for possibly sending a rescue expedition towards the North Pole, as the Roald Amundsen plane expedition had not been heard from since its departure five days earlier.
- Chicago mobster Angelo Genna was assassinated by the North Side Gang, crashing his car after a high-speed chase in which he was shot numerous times. He died in a hospital the next day.
- The Mongolian Air Force was activated.
- Born: Alec McCowen, English actor; as Alexander McCowen, in Tunbridge Wells, Kent, England (d. 2017)
- Died: Margaret Mick, 64, the first Canadian police officer to be killed in the line of duty; beaten to death by three female inmates who were escaping from the Toronto Municipal Jail Farm for Women (b. 1860)

== May 27, 1925 (Wednesday) ==
- An explosion killed 53 coal miners at Coal Glen near Farmville, North Carolina.
- In voting for leadership of the governing Reform Party of New Zealand, Gordon Coates received at least 19 of the 37 Reform Party votes required for a majority, defeating William Nosworthy and guaranteeing that Coates would become the new Prime Minister.
- Born: Samir Shihabi, Palestine-born Saudi diplomat, served as the President of the United Nations General Assembly from 1991 to 1992; in Jerusalem, British Mandate of Palestine (d. 2010)

== May 28, 1925 (Thursday) ==
- British Home Secretary William Joynson-Hicks announced that he had issued instructions that no "aliens known to be engage in subversive activities abroad" would be allowed into the United Kingdom to participate in next week's communist conference in Glasgow.
- Born:
  - Dietrich Fischer-Dieskau, German baritone singer and conductor; as Albert Dietrich Fischer, in Berlin, Germany (d. 2012)
  - Pavel Stepan, Czech pianist; in Brno, Czecheslovakia (present-day Czech Republic) (d. 1998)
  - Bülent Ecevit, Turkish poet and politician who served as the Prime Minister of Turkey four times between 1974 and 2002; as Mustafa Bülent Ecevit, in Istanbul, Turkey (d. 2006)

== May 29, 1925 (Friday) ==
- British aviator Alan Cobham set a new record for the longest nonstop flight in a light airplane, flying his de Havilland Moth from Croydon Aerodrome in London to Zürich, Switzerland. The flight consumed only 25 gallons of gasoline and six pints of oil.
- British archaeologist Percy Fawcett disappeared in Brazil along with his son Jack and one of his son's friends, Raleigh Rimmel, while on an expedition to search for what he referred to as the Lost City of Zed. Based on a description of the ruins of an ancient city, written by Portuguese explorer João da Silva Guimarães in 1753, Fawcett was on his second expedition to locate the ruins in the Amazon jungle in the state of Mato Grosso, and became convinced after discussions with the indigenous people that he would find a site near the source of the Xingu River. Fawcett's last communication of his location was made in a letter to his wife, delivered by a native runner, sent as he and the other two left their guide. The three members of the Fawcett party set off from their camp and never returned.

== May 30, 1925 (Saturday) ==
- Protests were staged in Shanghai against the unequal treaties. The Shanghai Municipal Police opened fire and sparked an international outcry; the May Thirtieth Movement drew its name from this incident.
- Los Angeles police announced they had foiled a plot to kidnap Hollywood film stars Mary Pickford, Pola Negri and Buster Keaton for ransom. Three arrests had been made.
- Gordon Coates took office as the 21st Prime Minister of New Zealand.
- In the U.S., two new counties— Martin County and Indian River County— were established by an act of the Florida Legislature. Martin County was created from portions of St. Lucie County and northern Palm Beach County, with the city of Stuart designated as the county seat. Governor John W. Martin, for whom the county was named, signed the bill that created his namesake county.
- Peter DePaolo won the 1925 Indianapolis 500, the first driver to complete the course in under five hours.
- Baseball's Pittsburgh Pirates set a Major League Baseball record that would stand 99 years later, hitting eight "triples" (a player's run to the third of four bases after a hits) in a 15 to 5 win over the St. Louis Cardinals.

== May 31, 1925 (Sunday) ==
- The German language opera Doktor Faust was given its first performance, 10 months after death of its composer, Ferruccio Busoni, and after its completion by Philipp Jarnach. The premiere took place in Dresden at the Semperoper, the opera house of the Saxon State Opera and was conducted by Fritz Busch.
- Rogers Hornsby, the National League's Most Valuable Player in 1925 and 1929, began his managerial career, as the player-manager for the St. Louis Cardinals. The Cardinals beat the Cincinnati Reds 5 to 2.
- Born:
  - Thomas Murphy, American broadcasting executive, CEO of Capital Cities Inc., known for engineering the company's acquisition of the ABC television network in 1986; in Brooklyn, New York City, United States (d. 2022)
  - Carl M. Allen, American merchant mariner and hoaxster who went by the alias "Carlos Allende", and who was known for creating the legend of the "Philadelphia Experiment" in 1955; in Springdale, Pennsylvania, United States (d. 1994)
- Died: John Palm, 39, Curaçao-born composer; died of tuberculosis (b. 1885)
