= Thomas Bidgood =

English conductor, composer and arranger (1858-1925)

- Born: 7 October 1858; Woolwich, Kent, England
- Died: 1 March 1925 (aged 66); Tottenham, London, England
- Occupations: Conductor and composer

Thomas Bidgood (7 October 1858 – 1 March 1925) was an English conductor, composer and arranger.

== Life ==
Thomas Bidgood was born in Woolwich, Kent. His father was William John Bidgood, a master plumber, and his mother was Jane Bidgood, née Williams. His early musical training included learning the violin at the London Academy of Music, taught by Signor Erba, and singing in the church choir. He also learnt a number of wind instruments after going to concerts given by the band of the Royal Artillery. He played the E♭ Tenor Horn (althorn) and E♭ Bass in the band of the 9th Kent Artillery Volunteers.

While studying at the London Conservatory of Music, Bidgood won several awards for his achievements. After graduation, he worked as an orchestral conductor, teacher and composer. While working at the Beckton Gas Works, he became bandmaster of the Beckton Band of the Gas, Light and Coke Company. Later, Bidgood founded various theatre orchestras in addition to conducting his own professional orchestra and wind band. As a composer he wrote entertainment music, waltzes, dances and marches.

A glimpse into his personal life is given by a report in The Times. In February 1891, he and his wife were living at 5 Vicarage Lane, West Ham, and the house was burgled. Bidgood returned from a professional engagement at around 2 a.m., went down for supper, and apprehended the burglar in the breakfast room. At the Police Station, the burglar was relieved of Bidgood's waistcoat, jacket, blue dust coat, overcoat, watch and chain, and other articles.

With his wife Emily, Bidgood had two children, but this marriage did not last. He set up home with Rosetta Butler (née Casselden), and they settled in West Ham under the surname of Barnard and had four sons. By 1911, they had moved to 162, Harringay Road, Tottenham, where they stayed until Bidgood's death on 1 March 1925 at that same address.

According to a coroner's report written on 3 March 1925, Bidgood committed suicide by gas poisoning "while of unsound mind" and is buried in an unmarked grave in Tottenham Cemetery. He left an estate valued at £100, and his widow, Emily Louise, had the administration of it.

He was the father of bandleader Harry Bidgood as well as the composer, conductor and founder of the London Chamber Orchestra, Anthony Bernard.

== Works ==
His works include:

- Sons of the Brave, his most famous march, written in 1898, very popular during the Boer Wars, later used in the film A Canterbury Tale (1944)
- In Coonland (1901) - American Fantasia
- other marches including:
  - Knight Errant (1901)
  - The Lads in Navy Blue, Merry Soldiers, Silent Heroes (1909)
  - The British Legion and A Call to Arms (1912)
  - My Old Kentucky Home and On to Victory (1917)
  - For King and Country (1920)
  - Vimy Ridge (1921)
  - Heroes of the Flag (1926)
  - Allies Parade, The Farmer's Boy, The Heroes of England, Rubinstein March, Where Glory Leads and St Patrick’s March
- A Motor ride, a humorous orchestral piece that had some popularity in the pre-1914 motoring age
- Honoraria
