= Edel von Rothe =

German ballet dancer (1925–2008)

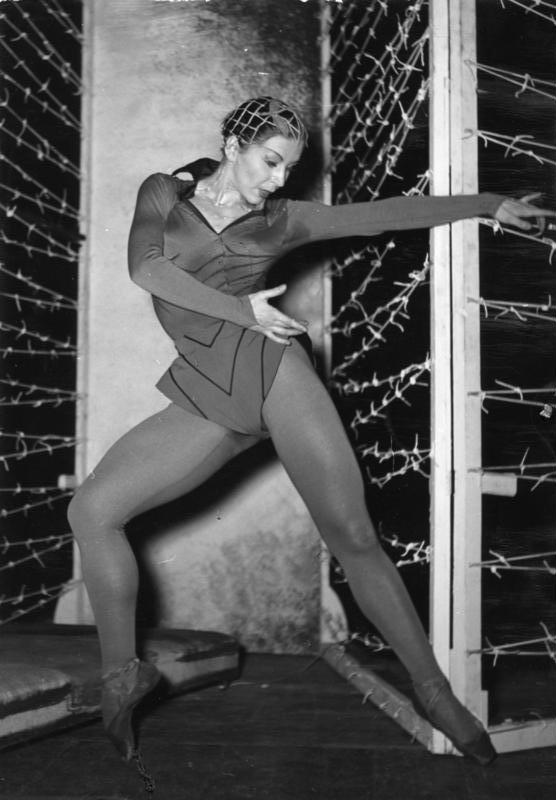
Edel von Rothe (1954)

Edel von Rothe (27 April 1925–19 November 2008) was a German ballet dancer with the Deutsche Oper am Rhein in Düsseldorf, where she became prima ballerina and ultimately ballet mistress.

== Biography ==
Born on 27 April 1925 in Berlin, she studied ballet from the age of eight under Tatjana Gsovsky. In 1950, she became a member of the Abraxas Ballet Company in Hamburg where she met Yvonne Georgi. When Georgi became director of ballet at the Düsseldorf Opera (later known as Deutsche Oper am Rhein), she engaged von Rothe who performed there as prima ballerina.

Von Rothe continued to dance in Düsseldorf until her retirement, although even then she returned from time to time to play the mother in Heinz Spoerli's The Nutcracker. She had starred in Otto Krüger's premiere of Stravinsky's Agon in 1958 and remained there for decades. In 1986, on the retirement of Erich Walter, with whom she had frequently danced, she became the company's ballet mistress. She retired in 1990 but maintained a close relationship with the Deutsche Oper am Rhein until she died in 2008.
