= Meade National Forest =

Former National Forest in Maryland, US

Meade National Forest was established in Maryland by the U.S. Forest Service on April 10, 1925 with 4,725 acres (19.12 km^{2}) from part of the Camp Meade Military Reservation. On December 2, 1927 the executive order for its creation was rescinded and the forest was abolished.
