= Ted Skeer =

American bank robber

Thaddeus R. 'Ted' Skeer was an American Prohibition-era bank robber, best known as an early associate of Harry Pierpont.

== Early life ==
He was born in Ohio, the son of Adolphus G. and Lellie M. Skeer. Thaddeus was the youngest of the family.

By the 1910 census, the family was living at 1329 Main Street in Fort Wayne, Indiana, where Thaddeus's father's occupation was listed as a paper hanger.

Skeer's older brother, Sylvester, was killed at aged 22 in an accident at his home in Cleveland, Ohio on August 26, 1913.

== Criminal career ==
=== Assault and Battery, 1917 ===
On September 1, 1917, Skeer was fined $10 and costs for assault and battery on Hilda Hartman. Skeer had slapped her on the back and made indecent remarks to her at Robison park.

=== Theft, 1917 ===
On September 20, 1917, Skeer and Carl Axt were both fined $1 and costs and sentenced to 120 days at the state penal farm for stealing a tire from an automobile belonging to the Coca-Cola company. Skeer claimed to have found the tire in a barn. Both young men were noted to have been hangers on at the local Gem pool room where they planned their crime.

=== Theft, 1917 ===
On November 24, 1917, Skeer's compatriot Carl Axt, 16, was sentenced to 30 days in the county jail for stealing an automobile tire. Skeer, who was also involved in the theft, was to be tried later.

Skeer had been sentenced from Allen County, Indiana in 1917 to the state penal farm on a charge of larceny.

=== South Side State Bank, Kokomo, Indiana, March 27, 1925 ===
At 1:30 in the afternoon of March 27, 1925, five armed bandits entered the South Side Bank at Kokomo, Indiana in a bold daylight holdup. The bandits made off with $4,828.40 in cash and $4,300.00 in Liberty bonds. Escaping in a blue Moon touring car, the bandits were witnessed by local resident, J.E. Fernung, switching their car for two Ford cars, which then headed south.

Initial reports stated that an additional $2,000.00 in non-negotiable securities had been stolen as well. Three local young men, who witnessed the robbery, reported that they did not raise the alarm because an apparent lookout eyed them closely while they were at the store across from the bank. The lookout quickly disappeared into the crowd after the robbery. The robbery took fifteen minutes, and after cleaning out the bank of valuables, the bandits calmly walked to their car.

The bank cashier, A.E. Gorton, reported that three bandits entered the bank, forced the employees to a back room, and while one bandit guarded them, the other two gathered all the money in sight. A gun was put to Gorton's head and he was forced to open the vault. Gorton, who had difficulty with the safe's combination, angered the bandit, who threatened "to blow his brains out."

While the bandits were working, a local resident, Vernon Shaw, entered the bank and was quickly relieved of the $18 he was carrying. "Speedy", a small terrier, boldly attacked a burglar's ankle, but was kicked into the basement. The bandits tore the telephone from the wall, broke a shotgun and took away the extra cartridges.

The blue Moon car used in the robbery was reported stolen the night before from Fort Wayne, Indiana, yet bore the license plate of a Chrysler Phateon reported stolen in Indianapolis on March 11. The vehicle was located six miles east of town with the rear riddled with bullets. The automobile was owned by Barrett M. Woodsmall of Indianapolis.

=== Arrest in Detroit, Michigan, 1925 ===
Skeer, along with Harry Pierpont and Skeer's girlfriend, Louise Brunner, were arrested by the Detroit police at their apartment on April 2, 1925. Pierpont was alleged to be the leader in the robbing of the South Marion, Upland and South Kokomo Bank. At his arrest, Pierpont gave his name as Frank Mason, but later in the day admitted his identity. Revolvers and guns were found under the pillows, in the closets and drawers of the bureaus. Harry was found to have $850.00 in new $100 and $50 denominations on his person, and the Brunner girl had a number of diamond rings and other jewelry, while one report indicated this amount was found on Skeer.

Other reports indicated that $4,000.00 in cash was found on Pierpont, with securities totaling $5,400.00 recovered in the apartment. Reports indicated that Pierpont, alias Mason, was wanted in Marion for the robbery of the Upland State Bank and the South Marion State Bank.

Police were tipped off to Skeer's involvement when it was learned that the auto used in the Kokomo robbery had been stolen from Fort Wayne a few days before. Skeer had been suspected in the automobile theft, and when the robbery was reported, police began working on the theory Skeer was involved.

The three prisoners waived extradition and warrants charging petit larceny and bank robbery charging Pierpont and Skeer had been issued by Kokomo city judge Joseph Cripe. Reports indicated Howard County prosecutor Howard Miller would pursue habitual criminal charges against both men, which would carry life sentences.

The Indiana Bankers Association had been looking for Pierpont since the robbery of the Grant County banks and had been on his trail for some time. Captain William Pappert of the Fort Wayne police department had reported that Skeer had been seen at the Brunner woman's home with a large sum of money. When it was learned that Brunner intended to travel to Detroit to meet Skeer, detectives followed her to the apartment shared by Skeer and Pierpont where the arrests occurred. Skeer and Brunner were arrested when the met in the city, and Pierpont's arrest occurred a short time later.

Initial reports in the Marion newspaper could not verify that suspect Everett Bridgewater had also been arrested. Bridgewater's wife, Mary had previously been arrested in connection with the gangs activities and was serving a term at the Indianapolis women's prison.

On April 3, James Roscoe "Whitey" Hayes, a third suspect, was also arrested by the Detroit police, but later released. Conflicting reports indicated that Hayes was wanted in Detroit as a material witness in a murder case.

In Detroit, Pierpont, Skeer and Hayes were all positively identified by A.E. Gorton, cashier of the South Kokomo bank; "Chic" Nelson, golf professional at the country club, and Vernon Shaw. It was Nelson who identified Hayes, a locally known singer, and allowed detectives to put the pieces together in tracking the members of the gang. Hayes had been identified by cashier Gorton as the bandit who stood in the doorway of the South Kokomo bank as it was robbed.

It was determined by the Kokomo police that members of the gang had been in the city for several weeks prior to the robbery of the South Kokomo bank. Pierpont, Skeer and Hayes were known to have had rooms with Mrs. Pearl Mullendore at 718 North Main Street. Pearl Mullendore was more frequently known as Pearl Elliott, a notorious Kokomo madam, who would figure prominently in Harry's later career with Dillinger.

Members of the gang reportedly threw wild parties in Kokomo and Anderson, Indiana where they displayed large sums of money to their women and were spending 'like drunken sailors'.

Pierpont and Skeer were extradited to Kokomo for trial and held in the Howard county jail. They were brought back to Kokomo under heavy guard, coming from Detroit to Peru by train and then on to Kokomo by auto.

==== Trial, Howard County, Indiana Circuit Court, 1925 ====
Bond for the bank bandits was set at the sum of $10,000 each, and attorney C.T. Brown was engaged to defend Skeer.

Skeer's trial for charges of bank robbery as well as conspiracy, were on the docket for May 7, 1925.

Skeer's attorney stated that he would plead enter a guilty plea and ask for leniency.

Skeer contributed evidence favorable to the state and he was given a term of two to fourteen years in prison, and served two years.

=== Arrest in Toledo, Ohio, June, 1929 ===
Skeer was arrested after a gun battle with police, along with his pal, Jack Gorhum.

Ohio authorities intended to keep him in their state and prosecute rather than returning him to Indiana to finish out his term of ten to twenty-five years for breaking parole.

=== Death ===
In the early morning hours of April 27, 1952, Skeer was shot to death at his night club, the notorious Hi-Ho club of 1900 Harris Street, Madison, Illinois. With over 250 people in the club and a cop within feet of the victim, one shot was fired directly into his chest. Skeer was pronounced dead upon arrival at St. Elizabeth's Hospital in Granite City with a severed spinal cord. Police identified Skeer as the victim, who had gone under the alias of Jack Kelly for a number of years.

The Hi-Ho Club was notorious for its lurid floor shows and as a hang out for hoodlums.

Press reports indicated that the police stated that Skeer had been convicted for armed robbery, counterfeiting and bootlegging in the past 37 years.

A 35-year-old ex-convict from St. Louis, Thomas Lindell Lawrence, was indicted for Skeer's murder. Lawrence was later sentenced to a prison term of one to seven years for manslaughter, and the Hi-Ho Club later became the home of Temple Baptist Church.
