= Tobyhanna National Forest =

Former national forest in Pennsylvania

Coordinates: 41.213°N 75.444°W

Tobyhanna National Forest was established in Pennsylvania by the United States Forest Service on April 10, 1925, with 20,870 acres (84.5 km^{2}) from part of the Tobyhanna Military Reservation. On October 10, 1928, the executive order for its creation was rescinded and the forest was abolished.
