= Sons of the Brave =

1898 marching song used by the Duke of York's Royal Military School

Sons of the Brave is a marching song written by Thomas Bidgood (1858–1925) in 1898. It has been the Regimental (School) Quick March of the Duke of York's Royal Military School (and its predecessor, the Royal Military Asylum in Chelsea, which was built for children of Regular British Army soldiers) for many years.

The march was used by the Household Division massed bands as one of the two 'neutral' quick marches during the Trooping the Colour ceremony in 2005.
