= Dix National Forest =

Former national forest in New Jersey

Coordinates: 39.96°N 74.51°W

Dix National Forest was established in New Jersey by the U.S. Forest Service on April 10, 1925 with 6,785 acres (27.46 km^{2}) from part of the Fort Dix Military Reservation. On April 6, 1928 the executive order for its creation was rescinded and the forest was abolished.
