= Ariel G. Loewy =

Romanian biochemist (1925–2001)

Ariel Gideon Loewy
- Born: March 12, 1925; Bucharest, Romania
- Died: February 13, 2001 (aged 75); Bryn Mawr, Pennsylvania, US
- Scientific career
- Fields: Biochemistry, cell biology
- Institutions: Haverford College

Ariel Gideon Loewy (1925–2001) was a biochemist and cell biologist who spent most of his career on the faculty at Haverford College in Haverford, Pennsylvania and was an adjunct professor at the Philadelphia College of Osteopathic Medicine at the time of his death in 2001. Loewy was widely recognized for his research on the biochemistry of blood clotting and his identification of Factor XIII, an enzyme involved in the clotting pathway. He also played a major role in the development of the molecular biology and biochemistry curricula at Haverford.

== Early life and education ==
Loewy was born on March 12, 1925, in Bucharest, Romania. His family left the country when he was a child, escaping the rise of fascism in Europe by emigrating to England in 1936 and then to Canada in 1941. Loewy studied botany at McGill University, from which he received his bachelor's and master's degrees. He moved to the United States in 1948 to attend the University of Pennsylvania, from which he received his Ph.D. in botany in 1951 for work on the motility of slime molds.

After graduation Loewy worked as a postdoctoral fellow at Harvard University, where he first began his work on the biochemistry of clotting; it was during this period that he identified Factor XIII and studied its transaminase enzymatic activity.

== Academic career ==
After a year as a research fellow at the University of Cambridge from 1952 to 1953, Loewy returned to the U.S. to join the faculty at Haverford College. He held the Jack and Barbara Bush Professorship in the Natural Sciences from 1983 to 1995 and spent a period as chair of the biology department. Loewy continued his research on Factor XIII, transaminases, and later on isopeptidases and their effects on neurofibrillary tangles, aggregates of tau protein found in Alzheimer's disease and other diseases known as tauopathies.

Loewy was known during his tenure at Haverford for his work in developing the curriculum at Haverford to focus on molecular and cell biology and biochemistry, an unusual emphasis for undergraduate biology education at the time. In 2000, Loewy left Haverford to teach at the Philadelphia College of Osteopathic Medicine.

Loewy served as an editor of the scientific journal Thrombosis Research and coauthored the major textbook Cell Structure and Function' with Philip Siekevitz, first published in 1963 and described as the first American textbook on cell biology. He also coauthored a second, more basic textbook, Biology.

== Personal life ==
Loewy and his wife had three sons and two daughters. Loewy died on February 13, 2001, of complications after a stroke.
