= Fariza Magomadova =

Uzbek-Chechen school director (born 1925)

- Фариза Магомадова
- Born: 4 April 1925 (age 99); Chechen Autonomous Oblast, Soviet Union
- Occupation(s): Boarding school director; educator
- Spouse: Yunus Magomadov

Fariza Vagabovna Magomadova (Chechen: Фариза Вагабовна Магомадова; born April 4, 1925) is a former Chechen boarding school director and teacher who pioneered efforts for female education in the North Caucasus. Magomadova has been awarded the Order of Lenin for her efforts in spreading secondary education, particularly for young women, in the Chechen-Ingush ASSR.

== Biography ==
Magomadova was born in 1925 in Chechnya. She graduated from High School No. 2 in Grozny, and attended college in Tashkent. After graduation, she worked as a mathematics and physics teacher at a secondary school and served as deputy director of High School No. 31 in Grozny. On 15 August 1959, she opened School No. 15, a boarding school for girls, on Revolution Prospekt in Grozny. At a time when parents were reluctant to allow their daughters to be educated, Magomadova fought to allow parents to send their daughters to her new boarding school. Her first class consisted of 120 girls, mostly daughters of transit workers, and they ranged from grades four through ten.

To ensure that her students would receive the best education of the day, Magomadova aggressively recruited the best teachers throughout the Chechen-Ingush ASSR to work at her new boarding school. The fledgling boarding school proved very successful, as within six years education had been expanded from first through tenth grades, and in 1976 classes were set up in a separate boarding school for boys. The educational model of Magomadova's boarding school gained wide acceptance throughout the republic, and more and more parents allowed their children to attend boarding school.

Magomadova left her post as boarding school director, to return to teaching - she would again teach math from 1983 to 1996. On July 9, 1960, the Presidium of the Supreme Soviet bestowed upon Magomadova the title of "Honoured Teacher", and two days later awarded her the Order of Lenin for her efforts. Magomadova has also been awarded the Veteran Labour award, and was awarded a pension by the Russian government on 23 August 1998. On 9 October 2003, the Russian newspaper Novaya Gazeta reported that arsonists had burned down Magomadova's home in Urus-Martan; her husband Yunus, also a recipient of the Veteran Labor award, subsequently died of cardiac arrest because he could not survive the loss. The article also mentioned that Magomadova had trouble getting reconstruction aid from the authorities to build a new home.
