= Lee National Forest =

Former national forest in Virginia

Coordinates: 37°14′20″N 77°19′40″W

Lee National Forest was established in Virginia by the U.S. Forest Service on April 10, 1925 with 7,177 acres (29.04 km^{2}) from part of the Lee Military Reservation. On June 23, 1928 the executive order for its creation was rescinded and the forest was abolished.
