= Sidney Pollard =

Austrian-born British historian (1925-1998)

- Born: Siegfried Pollak; 21 April 1925; Vienna, Austria
- Died: 22 November 1998 (aged 73); Sheffield, England
- Occupation: Historian
- Spouses: Eileen Andrews (m. 1949, divorced); Helen Trippett (m. 1982)
- Children: 3

Academic background
- Education: London School of Economics

Academic work
- Discipline: Labour history
- Institutions: University of Sheffield; Bielefeld University
- Main interests: Industrialisation

Sidney Pollard (born Siegfried Pollak; 21 April 1925 – 22 November 1998) was a British economic and labour historian, and Professor at the University of Sheffield. He pioneered the study of the role of economic management in the processes of industrialisation, which he thought was best examined at regional levels rather than national levels.

== Background ==
Siegfried Pollak was born in Vienna on 21 April 1925, to Moses and Leontine (née Katz) Pollak. They were Jews from Galicia. His father had arrived in Vienna before 1914, and his mother shortly after the beginning of the First World War to escape anti-Semitic riots. His father was a traveling salesman, and his mother had been a teacher before marriage. They were relatively wealthy, which allowed their son to attend a private secondary school. This school made students aware of the Jewish tradition to mediate and was therefore an early target of anti-Semitic attacks.

After the Anschluss (annexation of Austria to the German Reich) in 1938, the family lost their home and Moses Pollak was dismissed. The family was able to let Pollard leave with the Kindertransport programme to the UK, but his parents had to stay behind. Pollard never saw his parents again, and their fate remains unknown.

In England, he first attended an agricultural school, which prepared for a later life in a kibbutz in Palestine. In addition, he took correspondence courses. At the age of sixteen, Pollard went to Cambridge and worked in a nursery. He graduated from his correspondence, and was admitted to the London School of Economics in 1943. Pollard however volunteered in the British Army, and in this context anglicized his name. He remained in the army until 1947 as interpreter in occupied Germany. After his return he studied in Economics and graduated after two years. He obtained his doctorate in 1950 with a thesis on the history of shipbuilding in Britain in the period 1870 to 1914.

== Career ==
In 1951, Pollard began his academic career at the University of Sheffield as Assistant Lecturer. From 1963, he was full professor of economic history. Recognized as outstanding economic historian he was Visiting Professor in universities in Israel, the US, the German Democratic Republic, the Federal Republic of Germany, and in Australia. In 1971, he was invited by the University of California, Berkeley. However, despite the support of the university, immigration authorities refused him the permanent work permit because of his temporary membership in the Communist Party. Therefore, he continued to teach in Sheffield.

Pollard's work on economic and labour historian focussed on Anglo-American developments, which he compared with contemporary research. In his earlier work, he devoted himself especially to the social consequences of industrialisation. Starting point was his 1959 published work on the history of the labor movement in Sheffield. This work was followed by studies on trade union. In the mid-1960s, his research started focussing on the development of modern management.

From the 1970s, he focused particularly on industrialisation research. He did not take industrial development as a nation-state process, but described it as a regional phenomenon. He published his first essay on regional industrialisation in 1973. In 1981, he published Peaceful Conquest. His reinterpretation of industrialisation was inline with the research of Alexander Gerschenkron. In 1997, Pollard published his Marginal Europe, in which he describes the diminishing of former industrial zones since the late Middle Ages.

In 1980, he moved to Bielefeld University in West Germany, to the new Department of Economic History. After his retirement in Bielefeld in 1990 he returned to Sheffield, where he was awarded an honorary doctorate in 1992.

== Personal life and death ==
In 1949, Pollard married Eileen Andrews, and they had three children. The marriage ended in divorce. In 1982, he married Helen Trippett.

Pollard died from a heart attack at the Royal Hallamshire Hospital in Sheffield on 22 November 1998, at the age of 73.

== Selected publications ==
- Pollard, S. (1962) The development of the British economy 1914-1950 multiple editions to The Development of the British Economy: 1914–1990 (4th ed. 1992)
- Pollard, S. (1965). The Genesis of Modern Management: A study of the industrial revolution in Great Britain. Cambridge: Harvard University Press.
- Pollard, S. (1971). The Idea of Progress: History & Society. London: Penguin.
- Pollard, S. (1981). Peaceful conquest: The industrialization of Europe, 1760-1970. Oxford: Oxford University Press.
- Pollard, S. (1990). Wealth & poverty: An economic history of the twentieth century. Oxford: Oxford University Press.

Articles, a selection:

- Pollard, Sidney. "Factory Discipline in the Industrial Revolution. 1." The Economic History Review 16.2 (1963): 254–271.
- Pollard, Sidney. "Fixed capital in the industrial revolution in Britain." The Journal of Economic History 24.03 (1964): 299–314.
