= Murder of William Plommer =

1925 murder in Sheffield, England

The murder of William Plommer took place in Sheffield, England, on 27 April 1925. Plommer, a First World War veteran, was attacked in the street by a gang and died of his injuries shortly afterwards. Eleven men were placed under arrest in the aftermath of the murder, five of them eventually being convicted. Two of those convicted, the brothers Lawrence Fowler and Wilfred Fowler, were hanged at Armley Gaol, Leeds. The case was international news.

== See also ==
- Sheffield Gang Wars
