= Humphreys National Forest =

Former national forest in Virginia

Coordinates: 38°42′17″N 77°09′28″W

Humphreys National Forest was established in Virginia by the U.S. Forest Service on April 10, 1925, with 3,184 acres (12.89 km^{2}) from part of the Humphreys Military Reservation, now Fort Belvoir. On April 11, 1928, the executive order for its creation was rescinded and the forest was abolished.
