= August 1925 =

Month of 1925

<<	August 1925					>>
Su	Mo	Tu	We	Th	Fr	Sa
						1
2	3	4	5	6	7	8
9	10	11	12	13	14	15
16	17	18	19	20	21	22
23	24	25	26	27	28	29
30	31

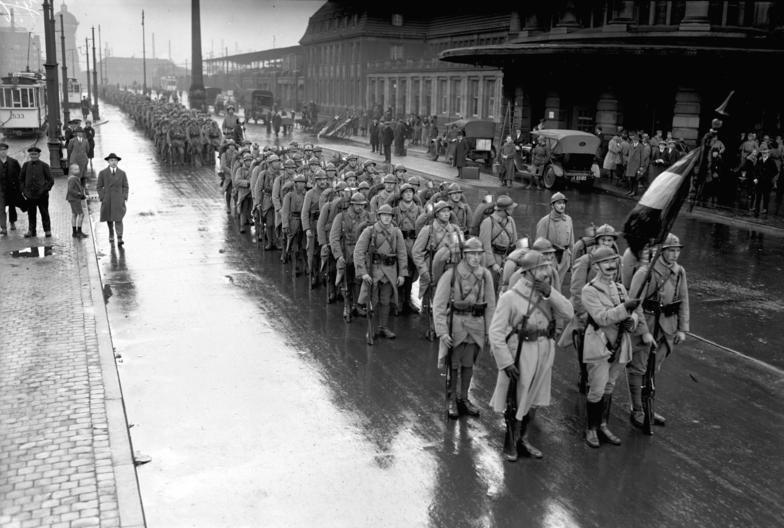
August 25, 1925: Occupation of Germany's Ruhr valley by France and Belgium is completed after 31 months. Pictured is the start of the French withdrawal from Dortmund in 1924.

The following events occurred in August 1925:

== August 1, 1925 (Saturday) ==
- Domingos Leite Pereira became Prime Minister of Portugal for the third time.
- The Eugene O'Neill play Desire Under the Elms was banned in Britain.
- Many British seamen began a strike in response to their monthly wages bring cut on this day from £10 to £9. Many who were on land refused to sail out; others at sea stayed wherever they landed, from Australia to New Zealand to South Africa.
- The Palestinian Citizenship Order 1925 came into effect in the British Mandate for Palestine.
- In the U.S., the National Football League (NFL) granted franchises to four new teams for the 1925 season, set to begin on September 20. New teams were granted to the New York Giants (owned by Timothy Mara and Will Gibson); the Detroit (1920s NFL teams)#Detroit Panthers (owned by Jimmy Conzelman; the Providence Steam Rollers (owned by sports editor Charles Coppen; and the Pottsville Maroons (arriving from Pennsylvania's Anthracite League). Each team paid a $2,500 franchise fee.
- Died: F. R. Japp, 77, Scottish chemist known for discovering the Japp–Klingemann reaction for synthesizing hydrazones and diazonium compounds (b. 1848)

== August 2, 1925 (Sunday) ==
- The two-day Battle of al-Mazraa began in Syria as 500 Druze and Bedouin horsemen, led by Sultan Pasha al-Atrash, attacked a much larger force of 3,500 French Army of the Levant troops, led by General Roger Michaud. In two days, 601 French troops were killed and 428 wounded. The victory inspired other groups in Syria to revolt.
- Born:
  - Jorge Rafael Videla, Argentine general, politician, and dictator, served as the President of Argentina from 1976 to 1981, was later convicted for war crimes; in Mercedes, Argentina (d. 2013)
  - Nim Hall, English rugby union player with 17 appearances for the England national team; as Norman Hall, in Huddersfield, West Yorkshire, England (d. 1972)

== August 3, 1925 (Monday) ==
- The Fascists won local elections in Sicily. Blackshirts were stationed at every voting booth to intimidate.
- Born:
  - Marv Levy, American professional football coach for the CFL Montreal Alouettes and the NFL Buffalo Bills; as Marvin Levy, in Chicago, United States (alive in 2026)
  - Dom Um Romão, Brazilian jazz drummer; in Rio de Janeiro, Brazil (d. 2005)
  - Karel Fiala, Czech operatic tenor and film actor; in Hrušov, Czechoslovakia (present-day Czech Republic) (d. 2020)
- Died: William Bruce, 61, Australian lawyer and Test cricket batsman; walked into Port Phillip Bay at Elwood, Victoria and drowned himself (b. 1864)

== August 4, 1925 (Tuesday) ==
- The last U.S. Marines were withdrawn from Nicaragua after a thirteen-year occupation by the U.S. that began during a civil war in 1912. The remaining guard of 129 enlisted men and five officers departed from Corinto on the transport USS Henderson.
- Hendrikus Colijn became the Prime Minister of the Netherlands, replacing Charles Ruijs de Beerenbrouck, who resigned along with his ministers after the July 1 elections.
- The Columbian Squires, a youth organization for Catholic boys ranging in age from 10 to 18, was founded by Brother Barnabas McDonald of the Knights of Columbus fraternal service order.
- Died: Charles W. Clark, 59, American baritone singer; died of a heart attack (b. 1865)

== August 5, 1925 (Wednesday) ==
- Plaid Cymru, now the leading political party in the UK committed to Welsh independence, was founded in a hotel in the village of Pwllheli, Gwynedd by H. R. Jones, Lewis Valentine and Moses Gruffydd of the Byddin Ymreolwyr Cymru; and Saunders Lewis and Fred Jones of Y Mudiad Cymreig; and D. Edmund Williams. The initial goal of the party was to make Welsh the official language of Wales.
- Turkey's President Mustafa Kemal divorced his wife of less than two years, Latife Uşaki, after her public efforts to emancipate women and to encourage their independence on choice of clothing.
- The so-called "Battle of Ammanford" was fought near the town of Ammanford in Wales as police defended a colliery from strikers determined to have a strikebreaking electrician removed.
- Died:
  - Georges Palante, 62, French philosopher and sociologist (b. 1862)
  - Albert R. Valentien, 63, American painter known for his water colors of flowers; died from angina pectoris (b. 1862)
  - Emily Harris, 87-88, New Zealand painter known for her watercolor flowers (b. 1837)

== August 6, 1925 (Thursday) ==
- General Grigory Kotovsky of the Soviet Union Red Army, a member of the All-Ukrainian Central Executive Committee in the Ukrainian SSR, was assassinated by a former assistant, Meyer Zayder.
- Eshugbayi Eleko, most important of the African kings within the British-ruled protectorate of Nigeria as the Oba of Lagos, was removed from his position by the colonial government and deported to Oyo two days later after refusing to vacate the royal household.
- The Dallas Hilton, the first high-rise hotel to bear the Hilton name, was opened in Dallas, Texas by Conrad Hilton.
- Born: Eddie Baily, English footballer and member of the England national football team's squad during the 1950 FIFA World Cup; as Edward Baily, in Clapton, London, England (d. 2010)
- Died:
  - Sir Surendranath Banerjee, 76, Indian independence activist known as "Rashtraguru" ("Teacher of the Nation") and founder of the Indian National Association (b. 1848)
  - Loretta Perfectus Walsh, 29, American sailor and the first active-duty woman to serve in the United States Navy; died of tuberculosis (b. 1896)
  - Samuel Hamilton, 23, Northern Irish footballer for Hull City A.F.C. in the English League; died a few days after his second surgery for a nasal condition (b. 1902)

== August 7, 1925 (Friday) ==
- The United Kingdom passed the Honours (Prevention of Abuses) Act, making it illegal to sell peerages or any other honours.
- Born:
  - M. S. Swaminathan, Indian geneticist and plant breeder known for his leadership in the a "Green Revolution" in working to prevent worldwide famine; as Mankombu Sambasivan Swaminathan, in Kumbakonam, Presidency of Fort St. George, British India (present-day Tamil Nadu state, India) (d. 2023)
  - Julián Orbón, Spanish-born Cuban composer; in Avilés, Spain (d. 1991)
  - Art Laboe, American radio host and radio station owner credited with coining the term "Oldies but Goodies"; as Arthur Egnoian, in Murray, Utah, United States (d. 2022)

== August 8, 1925 (Saturday) ==
- Approximately 40,000 members of the Ku Klux Klan marched down Pennsylvania Avenue in Washington, D.C.. A planned ceremony afterwards was cancelled due to heavy rain.
- Born: Alija Izetbegovic, Bosnian politician, served as the President of Bosnia and Herzegovina from 1990 and 1998 and as the first Chairman of the Presidency of Bosnia and Herzegovina in 2000; in Bosanski Samac, Kingdom of Serbs, Croates and Slovenes (present-day Bosnia and Herzegovina (d. 2003)

== August 9, 1925 (Sunday) ==
- The Kakori train robbery was carried out in British India by Indian independence activists of the Hindustan Republican Association at Kakori, a village near Lucknow.
- The German Socialist Labour Party of Poland was founded.
- In British Nigeria, Ibikunle Akitoye, President of the United Native Africa Church (UNA), was installed as the new Oba of Lagos after having been elected by the members of the Lagos Ruling House on June 26.
- Born:
  - David A. Huffman, American computer scientist known for his development of the algorithms for Huffman coding; in Alliance, Ohio, United States (d. 1999)
  - Robert Heppener, Dutch classical music composer; in Amsterdam, Netherlands (d. 2009)
- Died:
  - Christian Bartholomae, 70, German linguist, best known as the namesake of Bartholomae's law, a rule of interpretation regarding the Indo-Iranian language family (b. 1855)

== August 10, 1925 (Monday) ==
- Belgium and the United States opened talks in Washington, D.C. to settle Belgium's war debt.
- Born: Bohuslav Chňoupek, Slovak politician, served as the Foreign Minister of Czechoslovakia from 1971 to 1988; in Petržalka, Czechoslovakia (present-day Slovakia) (d. 2004)

== August 11, 1925 (Tuesday) ==
- French Foreign Minister Aristide Briand met with his British counterpart Austen Chamberlain in London to discuss Germany's proposed security pact.
- Born
  - Michael Argyle, British social psychologist and author known for The Psychology of Interpersonal Behaviour; in Nottingham, England (d. 2002)
  - Arlene Dahl, American stage and film actress; in Minneapolis, Minnesota, United States (d. 2021)
- Died:
  - James Douglas Ogilby, 72, Irish-born Australian ichthyologist (b. 1853)
  - Elisabeth Lemke, 76, Prussian German writer (b. 1849)

== August 12, 1925 (Wednesday) ==
- Germany indicated that the return of at least some of its former colonies would be set as a condition to enter the League of Nations.
- Born:
  - Norris McWhirter, English writer and twin brother Ross McWhirter, English journalist, co-created The Guinness Book of World Records and co-founders of Guinness World Records; in Winchmore Hill, Essex, England (Norris d. 2004; Ross d. 1975, murdered)
  - Donald Justice, American poet and Pulitzer Prize for Poetry winner; in Miami, United States (d. 2004)
- Died:
  - Severo Fernández, 75, Bolivian lawyer and politician, served as the President of Bolivia from 1896 to 1899 and as president of the National Congress from 1922 until his death (b. 1849)
  - Léon-Gustave Dehon, 82, French Roman Catholic priest, founder and leader of the Congregation of the Sacred Heart of Jesus from 1878 until his death (b. 1843)
  - Volodymyr Samiilenko, 61, Ukrainian poet (b. 1864)

== August 13, 1925 (Thursday) ==
- George Forbes was elected as the new leader of the New Zealand Liberal Party (NZLP), at the time the minority party, after the resignation of Thomas Wilford. Forbes defeated Thomas Sidey with a majority of the 24 votes cast, though the actual results were not disclosed. Forbes replaced Wilford as the new Leader of the Opposition in advance of the November 4 elections for the New Zealand House of Representatives.
- Born: José Sazatornil, Spanish actor and comedian, known for La escopeta nacional; in Barcelona, Spain (d. 2015)

== August 14, 1925 (Friday) ==
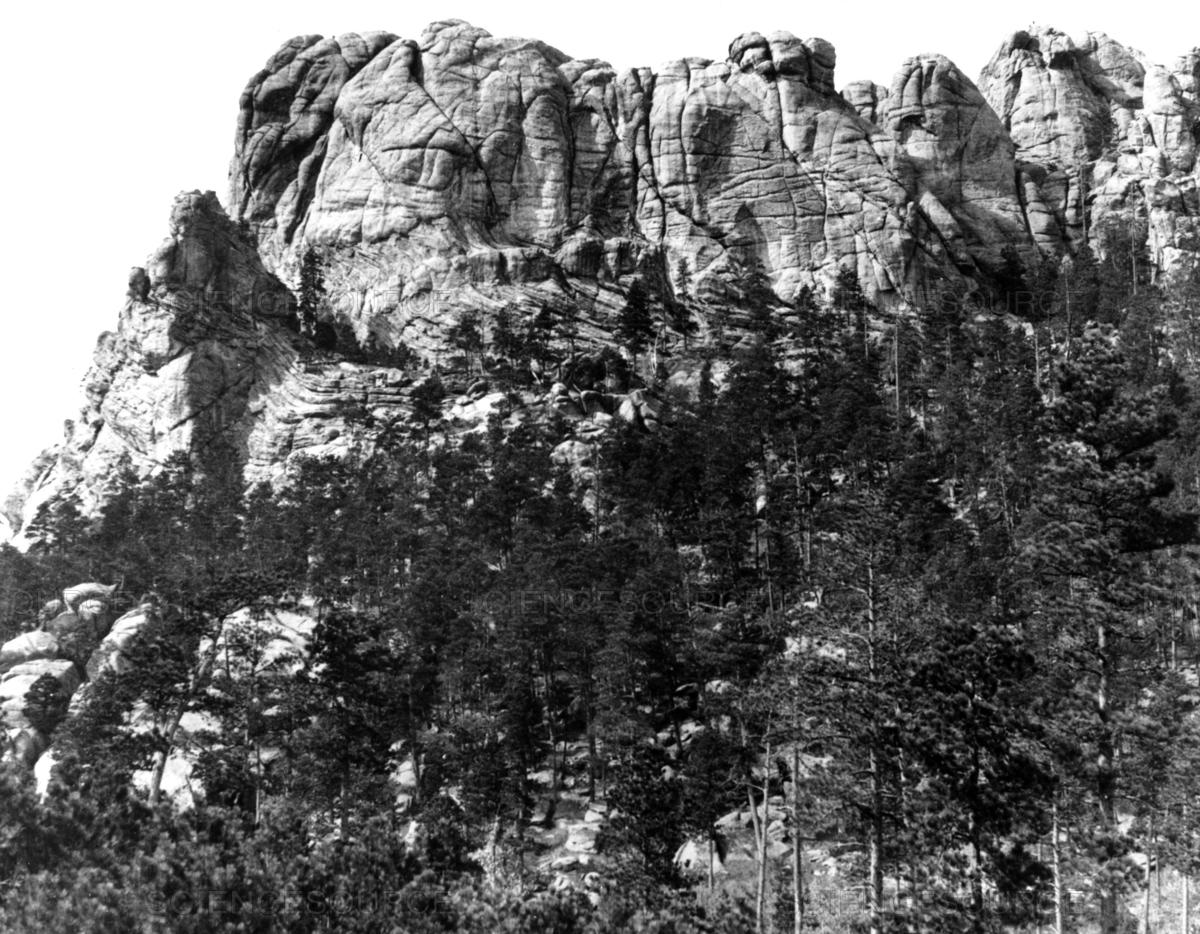
The Six Grandfathers

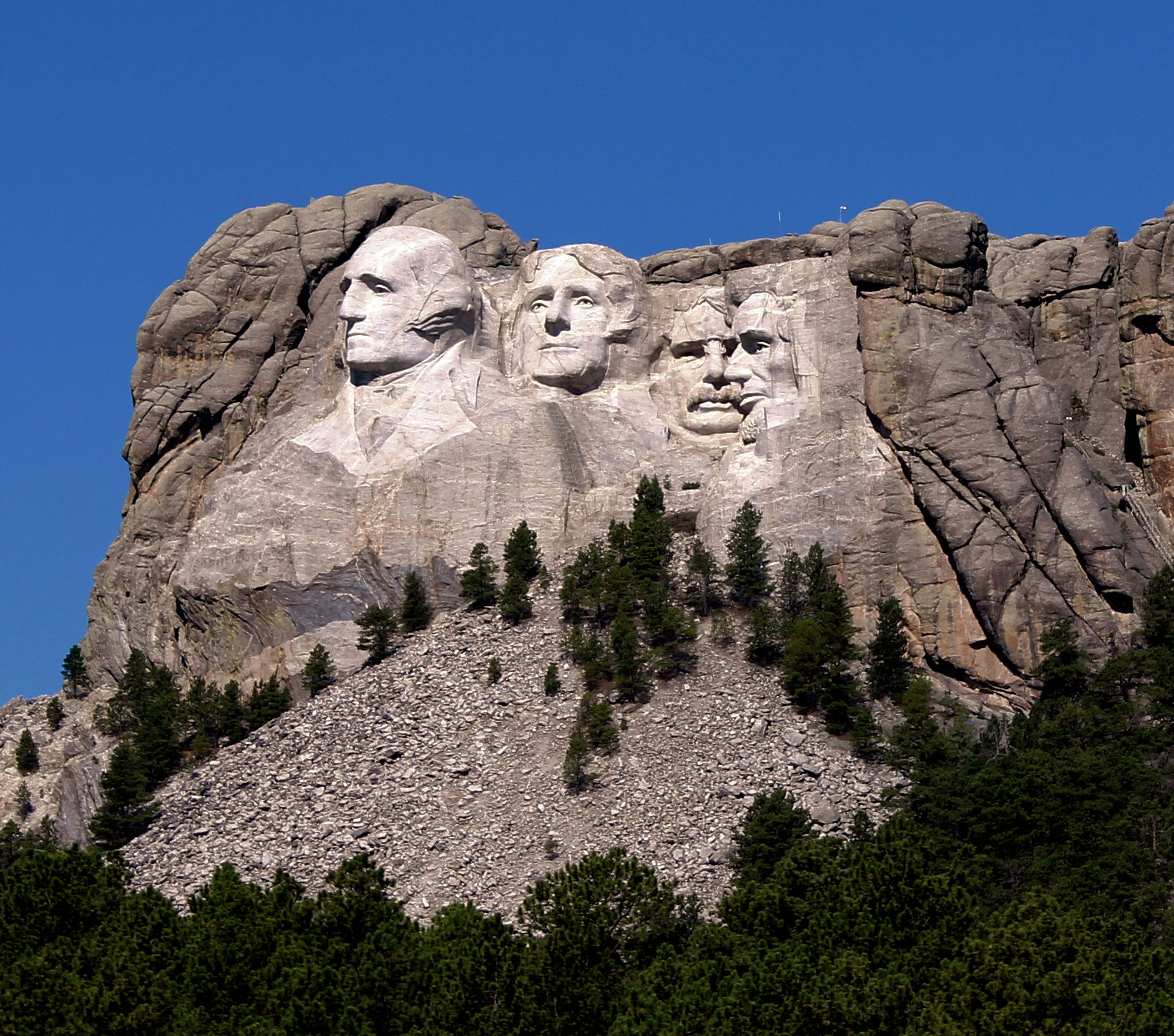
The Mount Rushmore monument

- Invited to the Black Hills region of the U.S. state of South Dakota, sculptor Gutzon Borglum scouted for an alternative location for carving a monument on the side of a mountain. Borglum's first choice had been to carve into "The Needles", but the granite formations were too thin for sculpting. With a view from the top of Harney Peak (now "Black Elk Peak"), Borglum spotted Mount Rushmore, traditionally called by the indigenous Lakota Sioux people Tȟuŋkášila Šákpe ("The Six Grandfathers") and commented "America will march along that skyline."
- Norway formally annexed the Spitzbergen Islands, as the Spitsbergen Treaty went into effect after being signed on February 9, 1920, and one month after the July 17 passage of the Svalbard Act.
- Born:
  - Manfred Clynes, Austrian-born American inventor, neurophysiologist, musician and concert pianist; in Vienna, Austria (d. 2020)
  - Rashid Karim, Bangladeshi novelist; in Calcutta, Presidency of Fort William in Bengal, British India (present-day Kolkata, West Bengal, India) (d. 2011)
- Died: Charles Jacot-Guillarmod, 56, French cartographer who created the first topographical map of Mount Everest (b. 1868)

== August 15, 1925 (Saturday) ==
- In the U.S., Norman Clyde became the first person to climb to the top of the 13,417 feet (4,090 m) high Mount Lamarck in California.
- Born:
  - Mike Connors, American actor and film producer; as Krekor Ohanian, in Fresno, California, United States (d. 2017)
  - Huda Sultan, Egyptian film actress and singer; as Bahiga Abdel'al, in Tanta, Kingdom of Egypt (present-day Egypt) (d. 2006)
  - Stephen de Mowbray, British counterintelligence officer; in Lymington, Hampshire (d. 2016)
  - Ruth Lessing, American professional baseball player in the All-American Girls Professional Baseball League who led the league in fielding average (1945), most assists (1946) and games played (1948); in San Antonio, Texas, United States (d. 2000)
  - Oscar Peterson, Canadian jazz pianist and composer; in Montreal, Quebec, Canada (d. 2007)
  - Bill Pinkney, American singer and member of The Drifters; as Willie Pinkney, in Dalzell, South Carolina, United States (d. 2007)
- Died:
  - Konrad Mägi, 46, Estonian landscape and portrait painter; died from tuberculosis (b. 1878)
  - Ralph "The Barber" Daniello, 39, Italian-born American gangster and mob informant; shot to death (b. 1886)

== August 16, 1925 (Sunday) ==
- The Cuban Communist Party was founded in Havana under the leadership of José Miguel Pérez, José Peña Vilaboa and Jorge A. Vivó, with financing from Soviet officials of the Communist International organization. Renamed the Popular Socialist Party in 1939, the party would exist until 1961 with its merger into Fidel Castro's Organizaciones Revolucionarias Integradas (Integrated Revolutionary Organizations), which in turn would become the new Communist Party of Cuba in 1965.
- Turkish Aerospace Industries (Türk Havacılık Ve Uzay Sanayi Anonim Şirketi or TUSAŞ) was founded as Turkish Aircraft and Engine Limited Company (Tayyare ve Motor Türk Anonym Şirketi, TOMTAŞ) in Kayseri.
- Born:
  - Bimal Kumar Bachhawat, Indian neurochemist and glycobiologist, known for his discovery of HMG-CoA lyase and for the elucidation of the molecular cause of metachromatic leukodystrophy; in Calcutta, British India (present-day Kolkata, India) (d. 1996)
  - Mikhail Kovalev, the last Soviet prime minister of the Byelorussian SSR from 1986 to the 1990 independence of Belarus; in Dubrovytsia (present-day Ukraine (d. 2007)
  - Kirke Mechem, American operatic composer known for Tartuffe; in Wichita, Kansas, United States (living in 2026)
  - Mal Waldron, American jazz pianist and composer known for "Soul Eyes"; as Malcolm Waldron, in New York City, United States (d. 2002)
  - Bullumba Landestoy, Dominican pianist and composer; as Pedro Rafael Landestoy Duluc, in La Romana, Dominican Republic (d. 2018)
  - Harold Paris, American painter; in Edgemere, New York, United States (d. 1979)
  - Gerald F. Hawthorne, American New Testament scholar and translator; in the United States (d. 2010)
  - Willie Jones, American professional baseball player; in Dillon, South Carolina, United States (d. 1983)

== August 17, 1925 (Monday) ==
- The Fourteenth World Zionist Congress opened in Vienna. Thirty people were hurt, and 50 arrests were made as protests outside the Congress by Austrian fascists turned violent.
- Benjamin Franklin University opened in Washington D.C., initially as a branch campus of New York City's Pace Institute. BFU would remain a white-only institution until integrated in 1964, and would close after the 1986–1987 academic year.
- Born: Li Zaiping, Chinese molecular biologist in genetic engineering; in Beijing, Republic of China (present-day China) (d. 2018)
- Died: Ioan Slavici, 77, Romanian writer and journalist (b. 1848)

== August 18, 1925 (Tuesday) ==
- A boiler exploded on the steamship Mackinac in Narragansett Bay off the coast of Rhode Island, killing 42 people, most of whom were scalded by the steam. The Mackinac had 677 people on board and had just departed the harbor Newport, Rhode Island, bound for Pawtucket when the blast happened at 5:55 p.m.
- Responding to Germany's embargo on imported American automobiles, Ford-Werke GmbH was established as a German corporation by the Ford Motor Company of the U.S. with a factory in the Westhafen district of Berlin. The factory would assemble its first Model T cars on April 1, 1926.
- The United States and Belgium signed an agreement on Belgian war debt.
- Born:
  - Brian Aldiss, English fantasy and science fiction writer and Hugo Award winner, writer of more than 80 novels and known for the Helliconia trilogy; in East Dereham, Norfolk, England (d. 2017)
  - Reuma Weizman, English-born Israeli public figure, served as the First Lady of Israel from 1993 to 2000 as the wife of President Ezer Weizman; as Reuma Schwartz, in London, England (d. 2025)
- Died:
  - Edward Flanagan, 45, American actor in vaudeville and on film; died from peritonitis after emergency surgery for stomach ulcers (b. 1880)
  - Eleonore Noll-Hasenclever, 45, German mountain climber who had climbed more than 150 summits above 12,000 feet (3,700 m) in her lifetime; killed in an avalanche while descending the Bishorn in the Pennine Alps (b. 1880)

== August 19, 1925 (Wednesday) ==
- The government of Guangdong (referred to by the Western press as "Canton" at the time) banned British and Japanese ships from entering or leaving the region's ports.
- Born: Frederic M. Richards, American biochemist and geneticist known for discovering the crystal structure of the ribonuclease S enzyme and for defining the measurement of the Lee-Richards molecular surface area; in New York City, United States (d. 2009)

== August 20, 1925 (Thursday) ==
- The day after the Chinese Kuomintang government in Canton (now Guangzhou) had banned British and Japanese ships from entering or leaving the harbor, the Republic of China's finance minister, Liao Zhongkai, was assassinated as he stepped out of his limousine for a meeting of the Kuomintang's executive committee. Five gunmen with Mauser C96 semi-automatic pistols shot him multiple times outside the building.
- As a French delegation was negotiating with the rebels led by Sultan al-Atrash for a peace agreement to end the Great Syrian Revolt in the French Mandate of Syria, a delegation led by Tawfiq al-Halabi arrived at al-Atrash's headquarters and persuaded him not to negotiate further.
- Born:
  - John Rassias, American professor who developed the Rassias Method for the teaching of foreign languages; in Manchester, New Hampshire, United States (d. 2015)
  - Juan Cancel Ríos, Puerto Rican politician and lawyer, served as President of the Senate of Puerto Rico from 1973 to 1976; in Barceloneta, Puerto Rico (d. 1992)
  - Robert T. Latshaw, U.S. Air Force fighter ace during the Korean War, with five shootdowns; in St. Louis, United States (d. 1956, killed in plane crash)
- Died: William Lancelot Jordan, 28, South African flying ace credited with 39 victories during World War One; died the day after being injured in a car accident (b. 1896)

== August 21, 1925 (Friday) ==
- Belgium passed a specific nationality law for the League of Nations mandated territory of Ruanda-Urundi (now the nations of Rwanda and Burundi) in Central Africa, separating the territory from the colony of the Belgian Congo (now the Democratic Republic of the Congo) and clarifying that African residents of the territory had no right to Belgian citizenship and were subjects of their native chiefs.
- The British seamen's strike spread to Australia.
- Born: Toma Caragiu, Greek-born Romanian TV and film actor; in Chroupista, Greece (present-day Argos Orestiko) (d. 1977)
- Died: Eugen Gutmann, 85, German banker and philanthropist known for founding Dresdner Bank and Deutsche Orientbank (b. 1840)

== August 22, 1925 (Saturday) ==
- Boxer Fidel LaBarba defeated Frankie Genaro in a ten-round decision to win the vacant World Flyweight Championship in Los Angeles.
- Born:
  - Honor Blackman, English actress best known for the role of "Pussy Galore" in Goldfinger (1964); in Plaistow, Newham, England (d. 2020)
  - Ashfaq Ahmed, Pakistani novelist and playwright; in Muktsar, Punjab Province, British India (present-day Punjab state, India) (d. 2004)
  - Malladi Chandrasekhara Sastry, Indian Hindu scholar and TV personality; in Krosuru, Presidency of Fort St. George, British India (present-dat Andhra Pradesh, India) (d. 2022)
  - Terry Donahue, Canadian professional baseball player in the All-American Girls Professional Baseball League and inductee to the Canadian Baseball Hall of Fame; as Theresa Donahue, in Saskatchewan, Canada (d. 2019)
- Died:
  - Zigfrīds Meierovics, 38, Latvian politician and diplomat, served as the Foreign Minister of Latvia from its independence in 1918 until his death, and as the Prime Minister of Latvia twice between 1921 and 1924; killed in a car accident (b. 1887)
  - Leo Lanzetta, 29-30, American gangster, narcotics dealer and bootlegger for the Lanzetta brothers; shot and killed in Philadelphia as he was leaving a barber shop in retaliation for the August 18 killing of rival bootlegger Joseph Toscascia (b. 1895)

== August 23, 1925 (Sunday) ==
- After winning two early engagements against French colonial forces in the Great Syrian Revolt, Druze leader Sultan al-Atrash declared a revolution across the Syrian Mandate against France.
- An assortment of fascists, monarchists and Nazis marched in a parade in Vienna protesting against the World Zionist Congress, shouting antisemitic slogans and singing patriotic songs.
- Born:
  - John Farber, Romanian-born American chemist, businessman and billionaire owner of the chemical conglomerate ICC Industries; in Timișoara, Kingdom of Romania (present-day Romania) (d. 2024)
  - Baldomero López, first lieutenant in the U.S. Marine Corps who posthumously received the Medal of Honor for his heroism at the Inchon Landing during the Korean War; in Tampa, United States (d. 1950, killed in action)

== August 24, 1925 (Monday) ==
- Welterweight boxing champion Mickey Walker fought William "Sailor" Friedman to a no-decision in Chicago. Al Capone met Walker in the dressing room before the match and advised him to go easy on Friedman.
- Born: Duncan Hall, Australian rugby league player with 22 appearances for the Australian national team (d. 2011)

== August 25, 1925 (Tuesday) ==
- The Occupation of the Ruhr in Germany ended after four years as the last French and Belgian troops withdrew from Düsseldorf, Duisburg and Ruhrort.
- In the U.S., the Brotherhood of Sleeping Car Porters was organized by A. Philip Randolph, Milton Webster, and C. L. Dellums at a meeting of about 500 African-American railway workers seeking higher pay and better working conditions in their jobs as domestic servants for the Pullman Company's sleeper cars.
- The Klaipėda Convention, signed on May 8, 1924, went into effect, placing the former German Memel Territory under the administration of Lithuania.
- In the Rif War, The Moroccan Rif city of Al Hoceima was virtually leveled from Spanish naval bombardment.
- The Legislative Palace of Uruguay was inaugurated in Montevideo for the use of the Senate and the Chamber of Deputies.
- Born:
  - Hilmar Hoffmann, German stage and film director, author of Kultur für alle!; in Bremen, Germany (d. 2018)
  - Thea Astley, Australian novelist and short story writer; as Beatrice May Astley, in Brisbane, Australia (d. 2004)
  - Evert Båge, Swedish Air Force officer, served as the Chief of the Air Staff from 1980 to 1984; in Alingsås, Sweden (d. 2021)
- Died: Franz Graf Conrad von Hötzendorf, 72, Austrian field marshal and Chief of the General Staff of the Austro-Hungarian Army and Navy from 1906 to 1917 (b. 1852)

== August 26, 1925 (Wednesday) ==
- African-American singer Marian Anderson first achieved fame as she performed in a concert with the New York Philharmonic orchestra after finishing first in a competition sponsored by the organization.
- Thunderstorms and flooding killed 11 people in Japan. Many bridges were washed out and a railway tunnel in Atami collapsed.
- Marshal Philippe Pétain took command of French forces in the Rif War.
- Born:
  - Gale Sieveking, French-born British prehistoric archaeologist known for his identification of where flint tools were most likely to be found based on trace elements; in Cagnes-sur-Mer, Alpes-Maritimes département, France (d. 2007)
  - Sangharakshita, British Buddhist spiritual teacher and founder of the Friends of the Western Buddhist Order in 1967; as Dennis Lingwood, in Tooting, London, England (d. 2018)

== August 27, 1925 (Thursday) ==
- The first issue of Automotive News was published. It was initially published five times a week.
- American waterskier Ralph Samuelson, who had already performed the first water ski jump on July 8, became the first speed skier when he reached a speed of 80 miles per hour (130 km/h) while being towed by a sea plane at Lake Pepin in Minnesota.
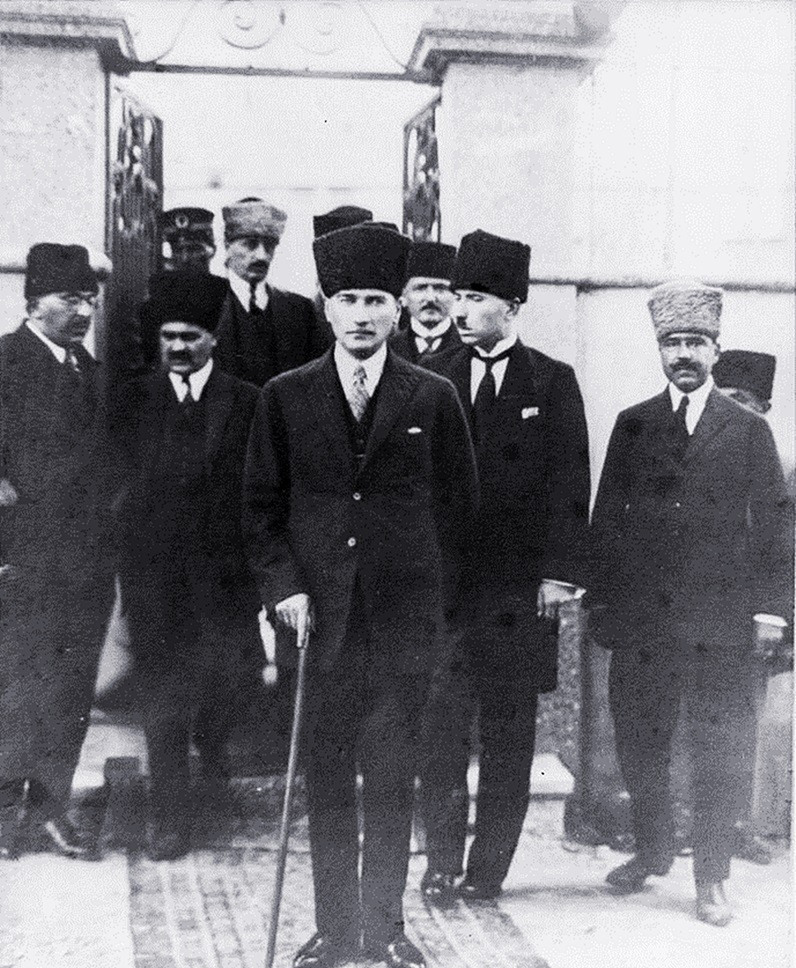
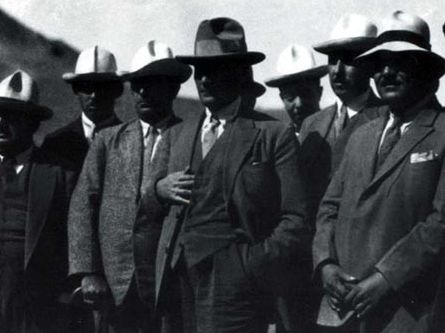
Kemal and Turks before and after Hat Revoution
- Turkey's President Mustafa Kemal, as part of his reform of previous Ottoman laws that required people of different religions to wear different headdresses and clothes, delivered the "Hat Speech" to a crowd at İnebolu and declared that the people should wear western-style headgear rather than the traditional fez, demonstrating it by wearing a white Panama hat.
- Born: Nat Lofthouse, English professional footballer with 33 caps for the England national football team; as Nathaniel Lofthouse, in Bolton, Lancashire, England (d. 2011)

== August 28, 1925 (Friday) ==
- Several prominent Nicaraguan politicians were kidnapped in Managua when armed men burst into a formal reception, took hostages and withdrew to the mountain-top fortress of La Loma.
- Born:
  - Donald O'Connor, American actor, dancer and singer known for Singin' in the Rain (1952) and the Francis the Talking Mule series of seven movies; in Chicago, United States (d. 2003)
  - Leonard Casley, Australian farmer known for his 1970 declaration of independence for his 29 square miles (75 km^{2}) wheat farm near Geraldton, Western Australia, as the "Principality of Hutt River micronation with himself as the ruling monarch; in Kalgoorlie, Western Australia, Australia (d. 2019)
  - Edward N. Peterson, American historian and author of numerous books on German and East German history; in St. Joseph, Missouri, United States (d. 2005)
  - Philip Purser, British television critic and novelist; in Letchworth, Hertfordshire, England (d. 2022)
  - John Gillett, British film critic for the British Film Institute; in Acton, London, England (d. 1995)

== August 29, 1925 (Saturday) ==
- The Chinese city of Shijiazhuang was incorporated in Hebei province as "Shimen" after the merger of two villages, Shijia and Xiumen. Within 20 years, migration would boost its population to 120,000 and after almost 100 years after its founding it had a population in 2020 of 6.2 million people.
- The Nicaraguan rebels released their hostages taken the day before and agreed to withdraw from La Loma in exchange for payment of a ransom.
- Babe Ruth was fined $5,000 and suspended for one week by New York Yankees manager Miller Huggins, after failing to show up for batting practice. Having missed four games, Ruth was reinstated on September 5 after apologizing to Huggins.
- In the Great Syrian Revolt, Druze rebels captured As-Suwayda citadel from the French after a forty-day siege.
- Singapore FA defeated Selangor FA, 2 to 1, to win the 1925 Malaya Cup championship game in Malayan soccer football.
- The 18-story luxury Mayfair Hotel (now the Magnolia Hotel St. Louis) opened in St. Louis, Missouri.
- Born:
  - Demetrio B. Lakas, Panamanian statesman, served as the President of Panama from 1969 to 1978; in Colón, Panama (d. 1999)
  - Nelly Beltrán, Argentine actress; as Nélida Dodó López Valverde, in Buenos Aires, Argentina (d. 2007)
  - M. G. Gupta, Indian Urdu language author and poet who wrote under the pen name Bekas Akbarabadi; in Kairana, United Provinces of Agra and Oudh, British India (present-day Uttar Pradesh, India) (d. 2011)
- Died:
  - Henry Jones Ford, 74, American political scientist, author and newspaper editor (b. 1851)
  - William Stoddard, 89, American novelist and journalist who had been private secretary for U.S. President Abraham Lincoln (b. 1835)
  - Sam Brown, 80, American frontiersman nicknamed the "Paul Revere of the Prairie" (b. 1845)

== August 30, 1925 (Sunday) ==
- Chile held a constitutional referendum with a choice of two draft constitutions. The liberal version supported by President Arturo Alessandri won with 94.84% of the vote.
- Mountaineer Norman Clyde became the first person to reach the top of the 13,899 feet (4,236 m) high Mount Agassiz in California.
- Italy's Ministry of Aeronautics was formed as a cabinet level department to regulate both the Italian Air Force and civil aviation, and as an equal to the Ministry of War and the Ministry of the Navy. Prime Minister Benito Mussolini appointed himself as the first Aeronautics Minister. The ministries of War, the Navy and of Aeronautics would be merged in 1947 into a single Ministry of Defense.
- Born: Laurent de Brunhoff, author and illustrator known for popularizing and continuing the Babar the Elephant series of children's books originally created by his father, Jean de Brunhoff; in Paris, France (d. 2024)

== August 31, 1925 (Monday) ==
- Peruvian aviator Alejandro Velasco Astete became the first person to fly over South America's Andes Mountains, departing from Pisco at sea level in an Ansaldo SVA biplane and, after reaching an altitude of 16,000 feet (4,900 m), landing 3 hours and 40 minutes later at Cuzco at an elevation of 11,200 feet (3,400 m).
- French and Spanish planes and warships conducted a massive bombardment of the Rif Republic capital of Ajdir.
- It was announced that Germany had met all its due payments under the first year of the Dawes Plan, which had commenced on September 1, 1924.
- A pair of PN-9 seaplanes under the direction of U.S. Navy Commander John Rodgers took off from San Pablo, California, attempting to be the first to fly from California to Hawaii and to set a new record for a non-stop flight by a seaplane. One of the planes, PN-9 No. 3, commanded by Lt. Allen P. Snody, had engine failure five hours into its flight and was forced to land on the water, but the Rodgers flight, PN-9 No. 1, continued toward Hawaii with its crew of five.
- Born:
  - Maurice Pialat, French filmmaker; in Cunlhat, France (d. 2003)
  - Ernest H. Nickel, Canadian-born Australian mineralogist known as the co-creator of the Nickel-Strunz classification for minerals; in Louth, Ontario, Canada (d. 2009)
  - Pete Vonachen, American businessman and minor league baseball team owner; as Harold Albert Vonachen, Jr., in Peoria, Illinois, United States (d. 2013)
