= September 1925 =

Month of 1925

<<	September 1925					>>
Su	Mo	Tu	We	Th	Fr	Sa
		1	2	3	4	5
6	7	8	9	10	11	12
13	14	15	16	17	18	19
20	21	22	23	24	25	26
27	28	29	30

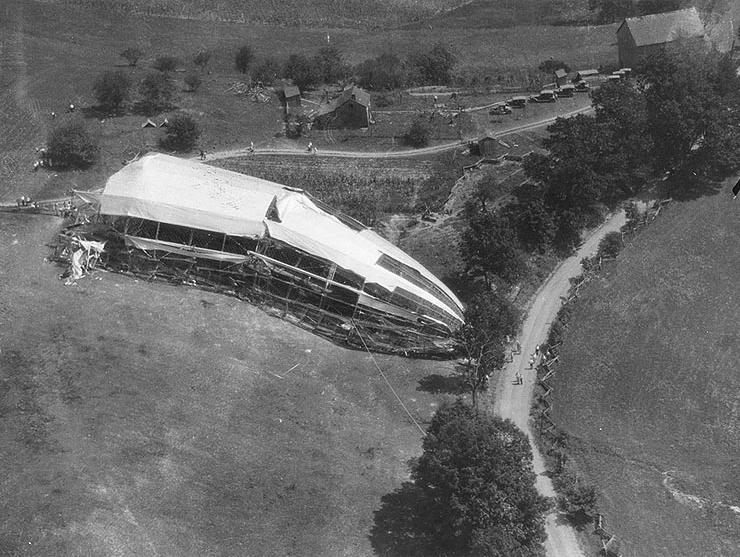
September 3, 1925: USS Shenandoah airship crashes, killing 14 of the 43 crew aboard.

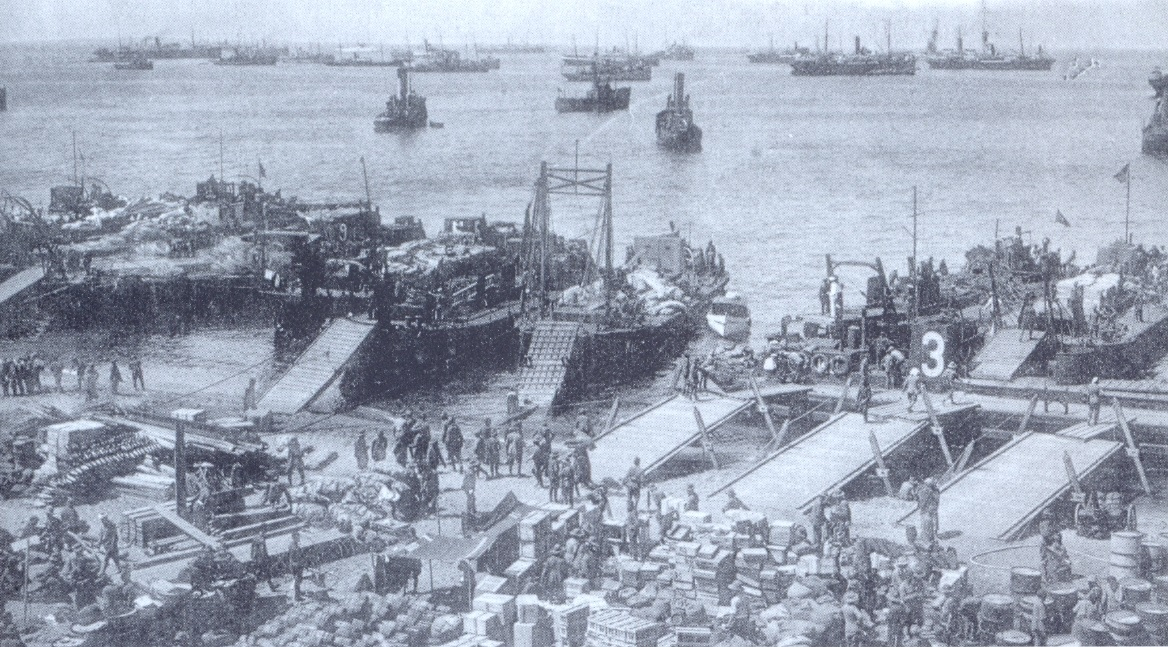
September 8, 1925: The first amphibious landing of tanks and troops takes place as Spanish forces come ashore on Moroccan coast.

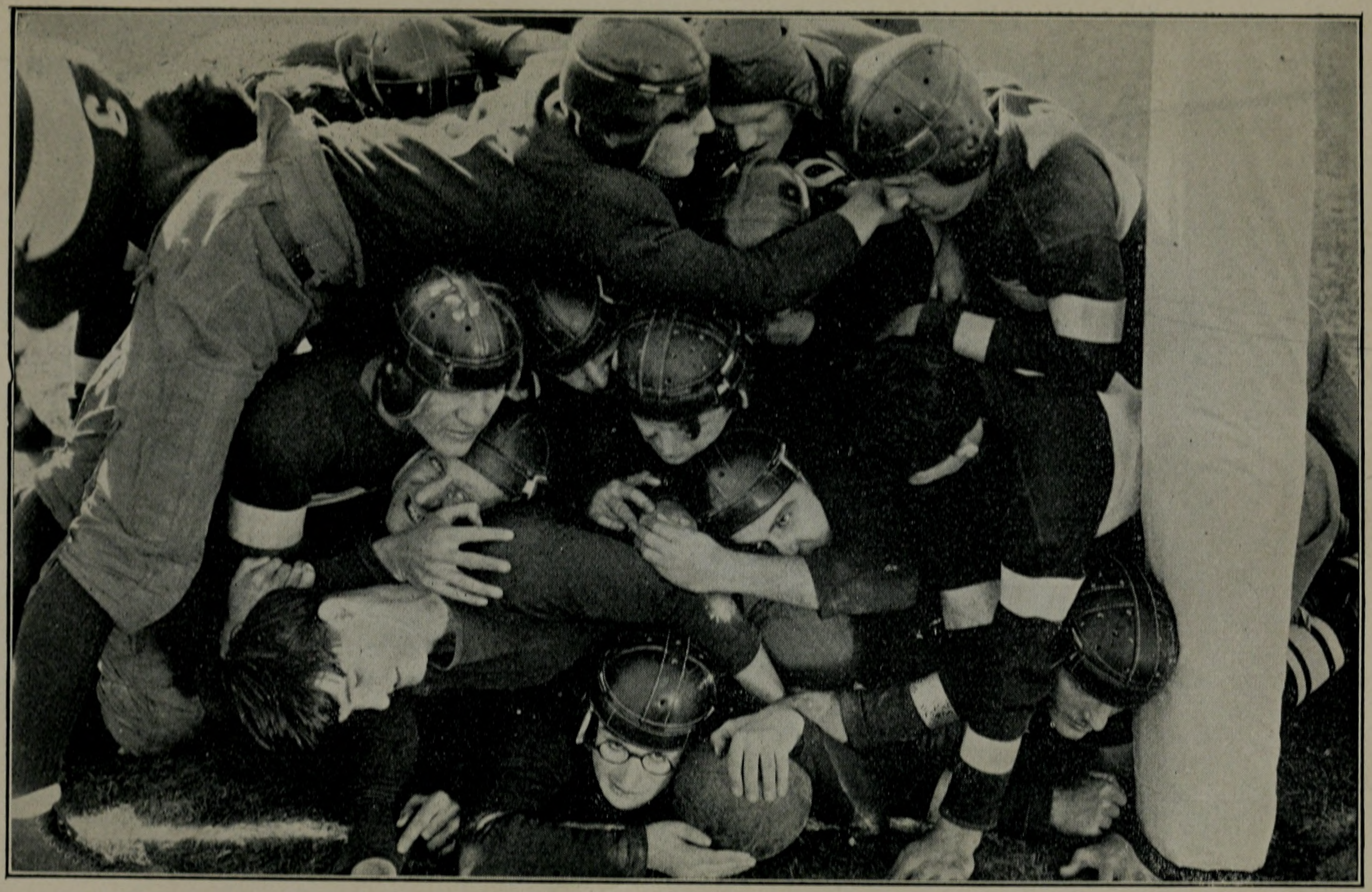
September 20, 1925: Comedian and stunt performer Harold Lloyd stars in hit film The Freshman.

The following events occurred in September 1925:

== September 1, 1925 (Tuesday) ==
- The Banco de México, Mexico's central bank, was inaugurated after having been authorized on August 25. The government-owned bank, initially led by director-general Alberto Mascareñas Navarro, was empowered to regulate exchange rates, interest rates, and monetary control, and the exclusive authority to mint coins and print banknotes, a task formerly delegated to private businesses.
- In a ceremony at the then-Chilean city of Tarata that began at 10:00 in the morning, the South American nation of Chile formally transferred its Departamento de Tarata to Peru as part of the resolution of a boundary dispute.
- Nicaraguan President Carlos José Solórzano declared martial law in the country as it was unclear whether rebels would uphold their promise to vacate the mountain-top fortress of La Loma.
- Danish seamen went on strike over their employers' refusal to raise wages. With seamen also on strike in China and across the British Empire, a large portion of the world's commerce was disrupted.
- A crew commanded by U.S. Navy Commander John Rodgers and four other members, who had departed from California in seaplane PN-9 No. 1 in an attempt to make the first flight to Hawaii, disappeared, prompting a search by U.S. Navy ships that had been placed in the area. The PN-9 had run out of gas 1,200 miles (1,900 km) into its flight while trying to locate one of the ships.
- Nazi Party member Hermann Göring, who would later become Adolf Hitler's chief advisor and commander of the Luftwaffe, was hospitalized in the psychiatric ward of the Långbro Hospital in Sweden after assaulting a nurse during his addiction to morphine. He remained in recovery for months until he could be rehabilitated.
- España Quinta, a Spanish troop transport carrying 1,000 Spanish Legion troops was reported sunk in Alhucemas Bay by Rif shelling. The report proved to be a false alarm and the ship was reported the next day as having arrived at Melilla in Spanish Morocco.
- Born:
  - Peter Mallett, Church of England priest who served as Chaplain-General to the Forces from 1974 to 1980; in Leicester, Leicestershire, England (d. 1996)
  - Madeleine Chapsal, French novelist; in Paris, France (d. 2024)
  - Colin Free, Australian screenwriter for television; in Sydney, Australia (d. 1996)

== September 2, 1925 (Wednesday) ==
- As part of his reform of culture in Turkey, President Mustafa Kemal Atatürk issued a decree closing all politically-oriented religious lodges, including the zawiyas associated with the Muslim Sufi order and the lodges of the Suci dervishes. The dervish lodges were converted into museums.
- The Banka Kombëtare e Shqipnis (BKS), Albania's central bank, was inaugurated in Durrës after having been authorized on June 22.
- The Australian government announced new tariffs that included preferences for British goods.
- Ship owners told Australian seamen that they would face no reprisals for their outlaw strike if they returned to duty within 48 hours.
- Born:
  - Gunnar Nilson, Swedish jazz musician; in Luleå, Sweden (d. 1989)
  - Marcela Delpastre, French novelist who write in the Occitan language and in French; in Germont, Corrèze département, France (d. 1998)

== September 3, 1925 (Thursday) ==
- The U.S. Navy dirigible USS Shenandoah broke up in a squall line near Caldwell, Ohio, killing 14 of the 43 crewmen aboard.
- Bautista Saavedra resigned the office of president of Bolivia after protests that followed his annulment of the results of the May 2 presidential election. Saavedra was replaced by the president of the Bolivian Senate, Felipe Segundo Guzmán, who scheduled a new election to be held on December 1.
- The Second International Conference on the Standardization of Medicine was held in Geneva, with the goal of standardizing drug formulae worldwide.
- French Army General, World War One hero and future traitor Philippe Pétain was appointed as the Commander-in-Chief of French Forces in Morocco to bring an end to the Rif War, replacing Hubert Lyautey.
- Born:
  - Herbert Parsons Patterson, American banker who served as president of the Chase Manhattan Bank from 1969 to 1972; in New York City, United States (d. 1985)
  - Shoista Mullojonova, Tajik singer; as Shushana Rubinovna Mullodzhanova, in Dushanbe, Tajik ASSR (present-day Tajikistan) (d. 2010)
  - Claire Malroux, French poet, essayist, and translator; as Josette Andrée Malroux, in Albi, Tarn département, France (d. 2025)
- Died:
  - Moisés Tuʻu Hereveri, 51-52, King of Easter Island from 1901 to 1902 (b. c. 1873)
  - Julius Stickoffer, 79-80, Swiss-born U.S. Army soldier who was the only Medal of Honor recipient to receive the medal for heroism in the second Black Hawk War (b. c. 1845)

== September 4, 1925 (Friday) ==
- The government of Norway appointed Johannes Gerckens Bassøe as the first Governor of Svalbard, which had been newly acquired as Norwegian territory.
- Rif rebels launched an offensive toward the Spanish-held city of Tétouan.
- Samuil Feinberg's "Piano Sonata No. 6" premiered in Venice.
- Born:
  - S. K. Ramachandra Rao, Indian author and Sanskrit scholar; as Saligrama Krishna Ramachandra Rao, in Hassan, Kingdom of Mysore, British India (present-day Karnataka state, India) (d. 2006)
  - E.G. Franz Sauer, German ornithologist who proved the theory that birds use the stars to migrate accurately; as Edgar Gustav Franz Sauer, in Mannheim, Germany (d. 1979)

== September 5, 1925 (Saturday) ==
- Two days after the Shenandoah crash, U.S. Army Colonel Billy Mitchell, the former assistant chief of the Army Air Service, issued a statement publicly accusing senior leaders in the Army and Navy of incompetence and "almost treasonable administration of the national defense." His defiant act, meant to call attention to the need for a strong air defense for the United States, would lead to his court-martial on direct order from U.S. President Calvin Coolidge.
- In the USSR, a joint protest against Soviet Communist Party Secretary Joseph Stalin was signed by Comintern leader Grigory Zinoviev, Lev Kamenev, Deputy Premier Finance Commissar Grigory Sokolnikov and Vladimir Lenin's widow, Nadezhda Krupskaya. Zinoviev, Kamenev and Sokolnikov would all become victims of Stalin's Great Purge and would all be executed.
- Canadian Prime Minister William Lyon Mackenzie King announced that the 14th Parliament was dissolved and that new elections were to be held on October 29.
- The ocean liner SS Sophocles barricaded its striking sailors into the ship and then pulled out of Cape Town, South Africa en route to Australia, but was forced to turn around and go back when the sailors refused to work.
- Born: William Conton, Sierra Leonean novelist, educator, and historian; in Bathurst, British Gambia (present-day Banjul, The Gambia) (d. 2003)
- Died:
  - Mahmoud Al-Ayyash, 27, Syrian revolutionary referred to as "Abu Stita;" executed at Aleppo by a French Army firing squad along with 11 other rebels (b. 1898)
  - Sir Lionel Woodward, 60, British colonial administrator and Chief Justice of the Federated Malay States from 1920 until his death; shot himself to death (b. 1864)

== September 6, 1925 (Sunday) ==
- The silent films The Phantom of the Opera, starring Lon Chaney in the title role; Kentucky Pride directed by John Ford; The Coming of Amos directed by Cecil B. DeMille; Pretty Ladies starring ZaSu Pitts; and The White Outlaw starring Jack Hoxie were released.
- Dietzen, a new colony on Scoresby Sund in Greenland, was established by Denmark.
- Tipperary defeated Galway on a score line of 5–6 to 1–5 (51 points to 8) to win the All-Ireland Hurling Championship.
- Gastone Brilli-Peri won the Italian Grand Prix in his Alfa Romeo P2 at Monza and completing the 800 kilometres (500 mi) race in 5 hours, 14:33.
- Born:
  - Nina Lowry, British barrister who became the first woman judge of the Central Criminal Court of England and Wales in 1976; as Noreen Margaret Collins, in Hampstead, London, England (d. 2017)
  - Freddie Oversteegen, Dutch resistance fighter during the German occupation of the Netherlands during World War II; in Schoten, Netherlands (d. 2018)
  - Jorge Noceda Sánchez, Dominican physician surrealist painter; in Santo Domingo, Dominican Republic (d. 1987)
- Died:
  - Riley Hatch, 63, American stage and silent film actor (b. 1862)
  - Philippine E. Von Overstolz, 78, American socialite and partron of the arts (b. 1847)

== September 7, 1925 (Monday) ==
- An attempt by Spanish troops during the Rif War to make an amphibious landing at Alhucemas Bay at Spanish Morocco ended in disaster. The Spanish withdrew after 361 of their troops were killed and 1,975 wounded.
- Italian Army General Maurizio Ferrante Gonzaga was appointed by Prime Minister Mussolini as the Commandant-General of the Fascist Party's Voluntary Militia for National Security (MSVN), more commonly known as the "Blackshirts".
- The Treze Futebol Clube was founded in Brazil.
- Amidst unrest in Shanghai, rioting occurred; several were wounded as British police fired on a crowd of over 2,000 demonstrators protesting unequal treaties.
- Born:
  - Laura Ashley, Welsh fashion designer who founded the Laura Ashley PLC retail chain of fashion stores in 1954; as Laura Mountney, in Dowlais, Marthyr Tydfil, Glamorgan, Wales (d. 1985)
  - Bhanumathi, Indian Telugu film actress, singer, novelist, music composer, and director known for Chandirani (1953); as P. Bhanumathi Ramakrishna, in Doddavaram, Madras Presidency, British India (present-day Andhra Pradesh state, India) (d. 2005)
  - Nosratollah Vahdat, Iranian comedian, actor and director, known for The Bride (Arouse Farangi); in Isfahan, Imperial State of Persia (present-day Iran) (d. 2020)
  - Oreste Benzi, Italian Catholic priest who founded the Pope John XXIII Community Association; in San Clemente, Emilia-Romagna, Kingdom of Italy (present-day Italy) (d. 2007)
- Died:
  - René Viviani, 61, French politician, served as the Prime Minister of France from 1914 to 1915 (b. 1863)
  - Thomas Ronayne, 75-76, New Zealand public servant involved in railway management, served as the General Manager of the New Zealand Railways Department from 1895 to 1913, and coal mine operator; accidentally killed after falling from a shuttlecar while visiting the Clydevale mine at Seddonville (b. 1849)

== September 8, 1925 (Tuesday) ==
- Spanish forces carried out the first successful amphibious landing with tanks, coming ashore at Alhucemas Bay in Morocco, the day after a disastrous first attempt. After a preliminary bombardment and a feint landing near Cape Tres Forcas.
- It was announced that explorer Roald Amundsen had signed a deal with the Italian government to use the dirigible N-1 in another attempt to fly to the North Pole, to be undertaken in 1926.
- Born:
  - Peter Sellers, English comedian and film actor known for portraying multiple characters in Dr. Strangelove (1964), and Inspector Clouseau in five of the films in the Pink Panther series; as Richard Henry Sellers, in Southsea, Portsmouth, England (d. 1980)
  - Bat-Sheva Dagan, Polish-born Israeli psychologist, author, and Holocaust survivor; as Izabella Batszewa Rubinsztajn, in Łódź, Poland (d. 2024)

== September 9, 1925 (Wednesday) ==
- In Detroit in the U.S., a white mob estimated at 5,000 people attempted to drive Dr. Ossian Sweet and his family out of the home that the black couple had purchased in an all-white neighborhood from the house on 2905 Garland Street. A white bystander, Leon Briener, who lived across the street, was killed by a gunshot fired from inside the house. Dr. Sweet was among those arrested and charged with murder, and a famous criminal case dealing with race relations in America would result.
- Rif rebels surrounded Tétouan.
- Russian composer Igor Stravinsky completed Serenade for piano in A major in Vienna.
- Born: Soňa Červená, Czech opera mezzo-soprano singer and actress; in Prague, Czechoslovakia (present-day Czech Republic) (d. 2023)

== September 10, 1925 (Thursday) ==
- Missing for nine days, Commander John Rodgers and the crew of PN-9 No. 1 were found after having fashioned a sail from the seaplane's fabric and sailing within 15 miles (24 km) of Nawiliwili Bay at the island of Kauai, after having sailed the plane 450 miles (720 km). U.S. Navy submarine USS R-4 located the seaplane and the minesweeper USS Tanager (AM-5) was dispatched and to tow the aircraft to shore. During the nine days, the crew had limited water and no food. Despite not reaching Hawaii by air, the Rodgers flight established a new non-stop air distance record for seaplanes of 1,992 miles (3,206 km).
- French troops led by Marshal Philippe Pétain launched a new offensive against the Rif rebels north of the Ouergha River.
- Joseph Goebbels meets Hitler for the first time.
- Born:
  - Boris Tchaikovsky, Soviet Russian composer; in Moscow, Soviet Union (present-day Russia) (d. 1996)
  - Wally Holmes, English rugby union player with 15 caps for the England national rugby team; as Walter Alan Holmes, in Nuneaton, Warwickshire, England (d. 2009)
- Died:
  - Henry Lincoln Johnson, 55, African American lawyer and politician, one of the highest ranking Black Republicans in the federal government as serving as the Recorder of Deeds for the District of Columbia from 1909 to 1913; died following a stroke (b. 1870)
  - L. D. Swamikannu Pillai, 60, Indian politician and President of the Madras Legislative Council from February 1925 until his death (b. 1865)
  - Frances Aymar Mathews, 59-60, American playwright and novelist (b. 1865)
  - Henry Fitch Taylor, 72, American cubist painter (b. 1853)

== September 11, 1925 (Friday) ==
- The British, French and German governments agreed in principle on a security pact, and began planning a conference to arrange for a formal treaty.
- Miss California, Fay Lanphier, was crowned the winner of the 5th Miss America pageant in Atlantic City, New Jersey.
- Born:
  - Harry Somers, Canadian classical music composer; in Toronto, Canada (d. 1999)
  - Willi Herold, German Nazi war criminal who deserted from the German Army, then impersonated an officer and ordered the executions of hundreds of German deserters at the Aschendorfermoor II prison camp in the closing days of World War II; in Lunzenau, Saxony, Germany (d. 1946, executed).

== September 12, 1925 (Saturday) ==
- The British Trades Union Congress adopted a resolution introduced by A. A. Purcell supporting "the right of all peoples in the British Empire to self-determination, including the right to choose complete separation from the Empire."
- The body of 8-year-old kidnapping victim Arthur Schumacher, was found. Nicknamed "Buddy," had last been seen on July 24 when he and his friends were running from a man pursuing them.

== September 13, 1925 (Sunday) ==
- Western Union Telegraph announced it had established direct unbroken contact between San Francisco and London through a new invention enabling the automatic repetition of signals. Prior to this development, operators at interim points had to copy the message and send it on to the next relay point.
- Xavier University of Louisiana, the first Catholic university for African-Americans, opened.
- Almost eight years after team handball was first played on December 2, 1917, the new German national team played its first international match, losing an outdoor meeting at Halle to Austria, 6 to 3.
- Born:
  - Mel Tormé, American jazz singer and composer, known for composing "The Christmas Song," and winner of two Grammy Awards; as Melvin Howard Tormé, in Chicago, United States (d. 1999)
  - Thomas Leigh Gatch, Jr., United States Army Reserve colonel and balloonist who disappeared on February 19, 1974 while attempting to be the first person to cross the Atlantic Ocean in a balloon (disappeared 1974)
  - Marshall Flaum, American screenwriter, documentary producer and TV director, winner of five Emmy Awards; in Bensonhurst, Brooklyn, United States (d. 2010)

== September 14, 1925 (Monday) ==
- Reports came from Tientsin in China that the bursting of a dike in Shandong Province had inundated villages 50 miles (80 km) from the river banks with water 30 feet (9.1 m) high, drowning an estimated 3,000 people.
- The stage production of The Jazz Singer opened on Broadway. George Jessel played the starring role which Al Jolson later made famous in the 1927 film version of the same name.
- Rif pressure on Tétouan was relieved as Spanish reinforcements broke the siege.
- On the eve of the feast of the Exaltation of the All-Honourable and Life-giving Cross of our Savior (September 1 on the Orthodox calendar), the Byzantine cross appeared in the sky over the city of Athens during an old calendar service of the Greek Orthodox Church, which at the time was being persecuted by the Greek authorities. According to witnesses at the scene, "a bright, radiant Cross of light" appeared above the Church of St. John the Theologian at 11:30 at night, and even the police sent to end the service "were among those who wept" alongside about 2,000 others who witnessed the miracle. According to Eastern Orthodox tradition, this was the third appearance of the cross and the first in more than 1,580 years, with the two previous sightings being October 12, 312 AD and May 7, 346 AD.

== September 15, 1925 (Tuesday) ==
- Crown Prince Umberto of Italy automatically became a member of the Italian senate, as per the country's constitution, upon his twenty-first birthday.
- Delta State University, located in the U.S. in Cleveland, Mississippi, opened for its first classes as Delta State Teachers College.
- Born:
  - Erika Köth, German opera coloratura soprano; in Darmstadt, Germany (d. 1989)
  - Kirill Lavrov, Soviet Russian stage and film actor and director, known as the star of The Brothers Karamazov (1969); in Leningrad, Russian SFSR, Soviet Union (present-day Saint Petersburg, Russia) (d. 2007)
  - Ajmal Khattak, Pakistani politician, leader of the Awami National Party from 1991 to 1999; in Akora Khattak, North-West Frontier Province, British India (present-day Khyber Pakhtunkhwa province, Pakistan) (d. 2010)
  - Helle Virkner, Danish film actress, known for the 1963 Bodil Award for Best Actress for Den kære familie; as Helle Genie Lotinga, in Gammel Rye, Denmark (d. 2009)
  - Jørgen W. Hansen, Danish footballer with 18 caps for the Denmark national football team; in Frederiksberg, Denmark (d. 1969)
  - Stevan Vilotić, Serbian Yugoslavian footballer who managed the Yugoslavia national football team from 1977 to 1978; in Šabac, SR Serbia, Kingdom of Yugoslavia (present-day Serbia) (d. 1989)
  - Giuseppe Fava, Italian investigative journalist, founder of I Siciliani and crusader against organized crime; in Palazzolo Acreide, Kingdom of Italy (present-day Italy) (d. 1984, murdered)
- Died:
  - Charles Melvill, 47, Commandant of the New Zealand Military Forces from 1924 until his death (b. 1878)
  - René Ghil, 62, French author known for Traité du Verbe and attempts to reform the English language (b. 1862)

== September 16, 1925 (Wednesday) ==
- U.S. Secretary of State Frank B. Kellogg announced that British MP and Communist Shapurji Saklatvala would not be allowed into the United States to attend the congress of the Inter-Parliamentary Union as a British delegate. The ACLU and U.S. Senator William Borah protested the decision but President Coolidge upheld Kellogg, since Saklatvala was not visiting as an official government representative. Saklatava canceled his plans.

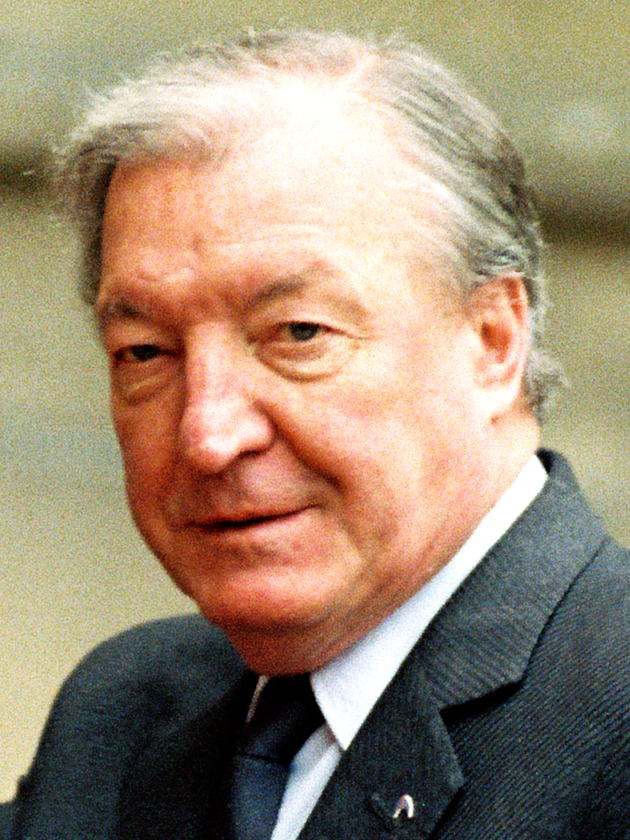
Charles Haughey (1925-2006)

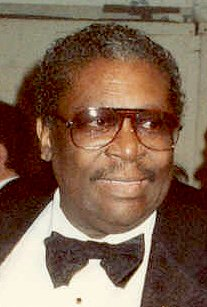
B. B. King (1925-2015)

- Born:
  - Charles Haughey, Irish politician, served as the Taoiseach of Ireland from 1979 to 1981, in 1982, and from 1987 to 1992; in Castlebar, County Mayo, Irish Free State (present-day Republic of Ireland) (d. 2006)
  - B.B. King, American blues musician; as Riley B. King, near Berclair, Mississippi, United States (d. 2015)
  - Christian Cabrol, French cardiac surgeon who performed Europe's first heart transplant in 1968; in Chézy-sur-Marne, Aisne, France (d. 2017)
- Died:
  - Alexander Friedmann, 37, Russian mathematician, known for the development of the Friedmann equations for calculation of the expansion of the universe; died of typhoid fever (b. 1888)
  - Seymour L. Cromwell, 54, American banker who was President of the New York Stock Exchange from 1921 to 1924; died after being thrown from a horse (b. 1871)

== September 17, 1925 (Thursday) ==
- Voting was held in the Irish Free State for 19 of the 60 seats in the Seanad Éireann, the upper house of the nation's parliament. With a slate of 76 candidates on a single ballot, voters could list the names of as few as one and as many as 19 of the candidates in a preferential vote. The Sinn Féin party boycotted the election, and turnout was low enough that the results were canceled.
- In an official ceremony, the Eastern Orthodox Church granted autocephaly to the Polish Orthodox Church, led by bishop Dionysius Waledyński, with a proclamation from Patriarch Gregory VII read in Warsaw at the Cathedral of St. Mary Magdalene.
- In Spanish Morocco as part of the Rif War, pilots of the Escadrille Cherifienne, a French Foreign Legion unit composed of Americans, bombarded the city of Chefchaouen, considered a holy shrine of the Jebala people.
- Syrian rebels carried out a night attack on French troops based at the village of Al-Musayfirah, with 900 of the French being killed or wounded. The intervention of French aircraft forced the Syrian rebels to withdraw.
- In Mexico City, 18-year-old Frida Kahlo was almost killed in a serious accident when the bus in which she was riding crashed into a streetcar. Kahlo sustained numerous injuries, including a fractured spinal column, from which she never fully recovered. It was during her two-year recovery in bed that she first began to paint.
- Born: Peter Ladefoged, British linguist and authority on phonetics of the world's languages and co-author of The Sounds of the World's Languages; in Sutton, Surrey, England (d. 2006)
- Died: Carl Eytel, 63, German American artist (b. 1862)

== September 18, 1925 (Friday) ==
- Gosstrakh SSSR, the state operated national insurance agency for the USSR, was created with the approval of the Central Executive Committee of the Soviet Union, and would control all insurance in the Communist nation until 1990.

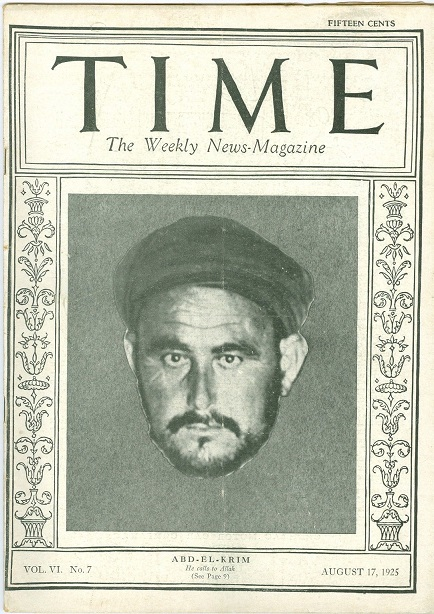
Abd el-Krim

- Sultan Yusef of Morocco put a $25,000 bounty on the head of Rif leader Abd el-Krim. The Rif warrior would surrender to the French Army on May 26, 1926, and be exiled to the island of Réunion for 20 years.
- H.P. Lovecraft wrote the short story In the Vault.
- Following the referendum approving it, the new Constitution of Chile was promulgated by President Arturo Alessandri, and went into effect 30 days later, setting a policy of separation of church and state, creation of an election tribunal to monitor voting, and strengthening the power of the president.
- Born:
  - Harvey Haddix, American professional baseball player known for his 1959 feat of pitching a perfect game for 12 innings before losing in the 13th; in Medway, Ohio, United States (d. 1994)
  - James D. Burke, American spaceflight engineer and the first manager of NASA's Ranger program for unmanned exploration of the Moon prior to the 1969 landing of astronauts; in Claremont, California, United States (d. 2023)

== September 19, 1925 (Saturday) ==
- The third-longest rail tunnel in the United States, the 10,325 feet (2 mi; 3,147 m)-long Tunnel No. 41, opened as a freight train of the Southern Pacific Railroad passed through Mount Judah in the Sierra Nevada Mountains near Norden, California.
- The U.S. State Department warned that U.S. citizens participating in the Rif War might be subject to prosecution for "high misdemeanor". An escadrille of American pilots was known to be flying for the French side.
- In New Zealand, Wellington YMCA defeated Seacliff AFC, 3 to 2 after extra time, to win the 1925 Chatham Cup of soccer football.
- Born:
  - Gérard Kango Ouédraogo, Burkinese politician, served as the Prime Minister of Upper Volta from 1972 to 1974; at Ouahigouya, French Upper Volta (present-day Burkina Faso) (d. 2014)
  - Pete Murray, British radio disc jockey and television presenter known for hosting BBC's first rock and roll programme, Six-Five Special; as Peter Murray James, in Hackney, London, England (alive in 2026)
  - Keng Vannsak, Cambodian inventor and linguist, created the first Khmer alphabet typewriter keyboard; in Kampong Cham province, French protectorate of Cambodia, French Indochina (present-day Cambodia) (d. 2008)
  - Franklin Sousley, United States Marine and flag raiser on Moutt Suribachi at the Battle of Iwo Jima; in Hill Top, Kentucky, United States (d. 1945, killed in action)
  - Remmie Colaço, Indian Konkani cinema actor and director; as Remédios Januário Colaço, in Curchorem, Portuguese India (present-day Goa state, India) (d. 2012)

== September 20, 1925 (Sunday) ==
- The first underground subway in Italy, the Passante Ferroviario di Napoli, was opened.
- The Harold Lloyd comedy film ,The Freshman, was released.
- Born: Hari Prasad Rimal, Nepalese singer, actor and film director; in Lalitpur, Kingdom of Nepal (present-day Nepal) (d. 2018)

== September 21, 1925 (Monday) ==
- All telephone and telegraph workers in Paris staged a surprise two-hour walkout as a protest against low salaries.
- The War Memorial Auditorium in Nashville, Tennessee was dedicated.
- The Vagabond King, an operetta by Rudolf Friml and Brian Hooker, was performed for the first time, opening at the Casino Theatre on Broadway for the first of 511 performances.
- Died:
  - Marcel Vialet, 38, French flying ace in World War I with nine victories; died from an illness contracted in Morocco during the Rif War (b. 1887)
  - Alfred Cotton Bedford, 61, American business executive and Chairman of the Board of Standard Oil Company of New Jersey from 1917 until his death; died from a heart attack (b. 1863)

== September 22, 1925 (Tuesday) ==
- The Jerome Kern, Oscar Hammerstein II and Otto Harbach stage musical Sunny opened on Broadway at the New Amsterdam Theatre for the first of 517 performances.
- The Last of Mrs. Cheyney, a popular play by Frederick Lonsdale, opened at London's West End at the St. James's Theatre for the first of 514 performances.
- The film The Circle starring Eleanor Boardman and Joan Crawford was released.

== September 23, 1925 (Wednesday) ==
- In British India, Hari Singh became the Maharaja of Jammu and Kashmir upon the death of his uncle, Pratap Singh.
- In a royal wedding at the Castle of Racconigi, Princess Mafalda of Savoy, daughter of King Victor Emmanuel III of Italy, married Philipp of Hesse, the grandson of the late Kaiser Friedrich III of Germany.
- The successful George S. Kaufman play The Butter and Egg Man premiered on Broadway at the Longacre Theatre.
- The Pittsburgh Pirates clinched the National League pennant with a 2–1 win over the Philadelphia Phillies, while the second-place New York Giants lost a doubleheader to the St. Louis Cardinals, 8-0 and 8-2. With 9 games left to play, the Giants could finish no better than 91-63 while the Pirates no worse than 93-61.
- Born:
  - George Laurer III, American engineer who developed the coding and pattern for the Universal Product Code; in Manhattan, New York City, United States (d. 2019)
  - Denis C. Twitchett, British scholar of Chinese history and co-editor of The Cambridge History of China; in London, England (d. 2006)
  - Jean-Charles Tacchella, French screenwriter and film director known for Cousin Cousine (1975); in Cherbourg, Manche, France (d. 2024)
  - Angelo Acerbi, Italian Roman Catholic cleric and Archbishop of Zella who became a cardinal at the age of 98; in Sesta Godano, Kingdom of Italy (present-day Italy) (alive in 2026)

== September 24, 1925 (Thursday) ==
- In the Great Syrian Revolt, French troops captured the Druze city of As-Suwayda.
- The airline Lloyd Aéreo Boliviano, founded by a consortium of German and Bolivian investors, made its first flight, from Cochabamba to Santa Cruz, using the German-made Junkers F 13 with room for four passengers.
- The Washington Senators clinched their second straight American League pennant by sweeping a doubleheader against the Cleveland Indians.
- Born:
  - Harry Jenkins Sr., Australian politician, served as the Speaker of the Australian House of Representatives from 1983 to 1988; in Caulfield, Victoria, Australia (d. 2004)
  - Autar Singh Paintal, Burmese-born Indian medical scientist known for the development of a single-fiber technique for recording afferent impulses from individual sensory receptors; in Mogok, British Burma (present-day Myanmar) (d. 2004)

== September 25, 1925 (Friday) ==
- Leonas Bistras took office as the new Prime Minister of Lithuania, replacing Vytautas Petrulis. Bistras continued in his role as Foreign Minister and made himself Defense Minister as well.
- The Reform Council for the East, created in Turkey by President Mustafa Kemal and presided over by former army chief of staff Ismet Inonu, issued its report to the Grand National Assembly recommending that the relocation of the nation's Kurdish minority to an area east of the Euphrates River, initially referred to as the Inspectorate Generalm and to be under military rule. Within the rest of Turkey, the use of languages other than Turkish would be forbidden and Kurds would be barred from employment in higher-level offices.
- Greece's Prime Minister Theodoros Pangalos created the Republic's first spy agency, the Ypiresía Ethnikís Asfaleías (YEA), the National Special Security Service, in order to fight the Communist Party of Greece.
- The first recorded use of a machine gun in organized crime took place in the U.S. city of Chicago when an attempt was made to kill Spike O'Donnell, leader of the "Sheldon Gang", in a drive-by shooting. "Hit men", hired by Joe Saltis and Frank McErlane. O'Donnell was talking to a Chicago police officer in front of Weiss drug store at 63rd Street and Western Avenue when a car with four men drove by and fired at him with a Thompson submachine gun, soon to be nicknamed a "tommy gun" in what one writer described as "the first time the deadly weapon was used in Chicago gang warfare". Because use of the weapon, previously confined to military use, was new to civilian crime, the report the next day concluded from the use of eight bullets that the hitmen had used "four shotguns", each firing "two cartridges"; nobody was injured in the shooting.
- The U.S. submarine USS S-51 was sunk off the coast of Rhode Island in a collision with a merchant steamer, killing 33 of the 36 crew aboard. The merchant ship, City of Rome, had spotted S-51 by its masthead light, but was unable to determine the sub's course or intentions, and altered its course, only to realize that it was heading toward the side of the submarine.
- Born:
  - Samson H. Chowdhury, Bangladeshi business magnate and co-founder of Square Pharmaceuticals; in Gopalganj, Presidency of Fort William in Bengal, British India (present-day Bangladesh) (d. 2012)
  - Paul MacCready, American aeronautical engineer who designed the first successful human-powered aircraft, the Kremer prize-winning Gossamer Condor 2; in New Haven, Connecticut, United States (d. 2007)

== September 26, 1925 (Saturday) ==
- Germany accepted an invitation to attend a European security conference set to open October 5, with the Swiss town of Locarno set as the likely location.
- Born:
  - Marty Robbins, American country music singer, Grammy Award winner and NASCAR racing driver, best known for his hit song "El Paso"; as Martin Robinson, in Glendale, Arizona, United States (d. 1982)
  - Emil Spiridonov, Soviet Navy Admiral who was commander of the Pacific Fleet at the time of his death; in Makaryev, Russian SFSR, Soviet Union (present-day Russia) (d. 1981, killed in plane crash)
  - Bobby Shantz, American professional baseball player, MVP of the American League in 1952 and ERA leader in Major League Baseball 1957; as Robert Clayton Shantz, in Pottstown, Pennsylvania, United States (alive in 2026)
- Died:
  - António Pereira Cândido de Figueiredo, 79, Portuguese lexicographer who was author of the Novo Dicionário da Língua Portuguesa (b. 1846)
  - Miguel Zabalza, 29, Spanish Olympic fencer; killed in action in the Rif War (b. 1896)

== September 27, 1925 (Sunday) ==
- Hundreds of people died in Shandong Province as the Yellow River overflowed in China, the worst flooding since the 1887 deluge.
- In Ireland, the newly-created National Hurling League began its first season with seven hurling teams— Cork, Dublin, Galway. Kilkenny, Laois, Limerick and Tipperary— starting a schedule of playing each other once, for six games total, in a six-game single round-robin tournament. The two teams with the best records were scheduled to play each other in a championship game on May 16.
- Norwegian athlete Charles Hoff broke his own pole vault record again with a height of 4.25 metres (13.9 ft) at a meet in Turku in Finland.
- The Hindu right-wing Hindu nationalist paramilitary organization Rashtriya Swayamsevak Sangh (RSS) was established by Dr. K. B. Hedgewar in India.
- The second paper in the trilogy that launched matrix mechanics, "Zur Quantenmechanik" ("On Quantum Mechanics"), by Max Born and Pascual Jordan, was received for publication by Zeitschrift für Physik, two months after Werner Heisenberg had submitted his famous Umdeutung paper.
- The war film The Dark Angel and the drama film The Mystic opened.
- Born: Robert Edwards, British physiologist and pioneer in in-vitro fertilisation who worked with gynecologist Patrick Steptoe and embryologist Jean Purdy for the conception and birth of the first "test-tube baby;" in Batley, England (d. 2013)

== September 28, 1925 (Monday) ==
- The American Debt Funding Commission gave France a plan for settlement of French debt from loans during the war, which would see France pay $40 million a year on a total obligation of over $3.3 billion plus interest.
- Born:
  - Cromwell Everson, South African composer; in Beaufort West, Union of South Africa (present-day South Africa) (d. 1991)
  - Carolyn Morris, American baseball pitcher for the AAGPBL's Rockford Peaches, known for pitching a perfect game; in Phoenix, Arizona, United States (d. 1996)
- Died:
  - Luisa Martínez Casado, 64-65, Cuban stage actress (b. 1896)
  - Alejandro Velasco Astete, 28, Peruvian aviator, first pilot to fly over the Andes Mountains in South America; killed after his plane collided with an obstacle as he attempted avoid hitting a crowd of people while trying to land in Puno, Peru (b. 1897)

== September 29, 1925 (Tuesday) ==
- The British Foreign Office said that the Treaty of Versailles, particularly Article 231, would not be up for revision at the upcoming Locarno conference. A communique about the conference included the statement, "The question of Germany's responsibility for the war is not raised by the proposed pact. We are at a loss to know why the German government thought it proper to raise it at this moment, and are obliged to observe that the negotiation of a security pact cannot modify the Treaty of Versailles nor alter the judgment of the past."
- At a party congress in Liverpool, Britain's Labour Party overwhelmingly voted against a merger with the Communist Party of Great Britain and to exclude communists from their membership ranks.
- In a special election to fill the U.S. Senate seat of the late Robert M. La Follette, his son, Robert La Follette Jr., defeated challenger Edward Dithmar by a 2 to 1 margin.
- Born:
  - Jane Stuart Smith, American opera soprano; in Norfolk, Virginia, United States (d. 2016)
  - Eugenia Apostol, Filipino newspaper publisher known for her opposition to the government in the magazine Mr & Ms that helped lead to the downfall of presidents Ferdinand Marcos and Joseph Estrada; in Sorsogon City, Philippine Islands (present-day Philippines) (d. 2026)
- Died: Léon Bourgeois, 74, French statesman, served as the Prime Minister of France from 1895 to 1896, President of the Assembly of the League of Nations, and recipient of the Nobel Peace Prize in 1920 (b. 1851)

== September 30, 1925 (Wednesday) ==
- Greek dictator Theodoros Pangalos dissolved the country's Constituent Assembly, explaining that it had lost the confidence of the nation and presented an obstacle to its recovery. Pangalos said new elections would be conducted.
- A Vatican committee issued a circular to the directors of pilgrimages notifying them that women found in churches not wearing opaque clothing that covered their head, collar, legs and upper arms would be ejected.
- The Medical Mission Sisters, the first Roman Catholic medical organization to be operated by nuns, was founded in Washington, D.C. by physicians Anna Dengel of Austria and Dr. Johanna Lyons of Chicago, and by registered nurses Evelyn Flieger of Britain and Marie Ulbrich.
- Jewelry valued at $750,000 was stolen from the six-room Plaza Hotel suite of Woolworth heiress Mrs. Jessie Woolworth Donahue, daughter of F.W. Woolworth. They were stolen in broad daylight from her bedroom while she was in the bathtub a few feet away.
- Born: Arkady Ostashev, Soviet Russian scientist and rocket propulsion and control system designer who participated in the 1957 launch of the first artificial Earth satellite, Sputnik 1, and the 1961 launch of the first cosmonaut, Yuri Gagarin; in village Maly Vasilyev, Moscow Oblast, Soviet Union (present-day Russia) (d. 1998)
