= Olbers-Planetarium =

Planetarium in Bremen, Germany

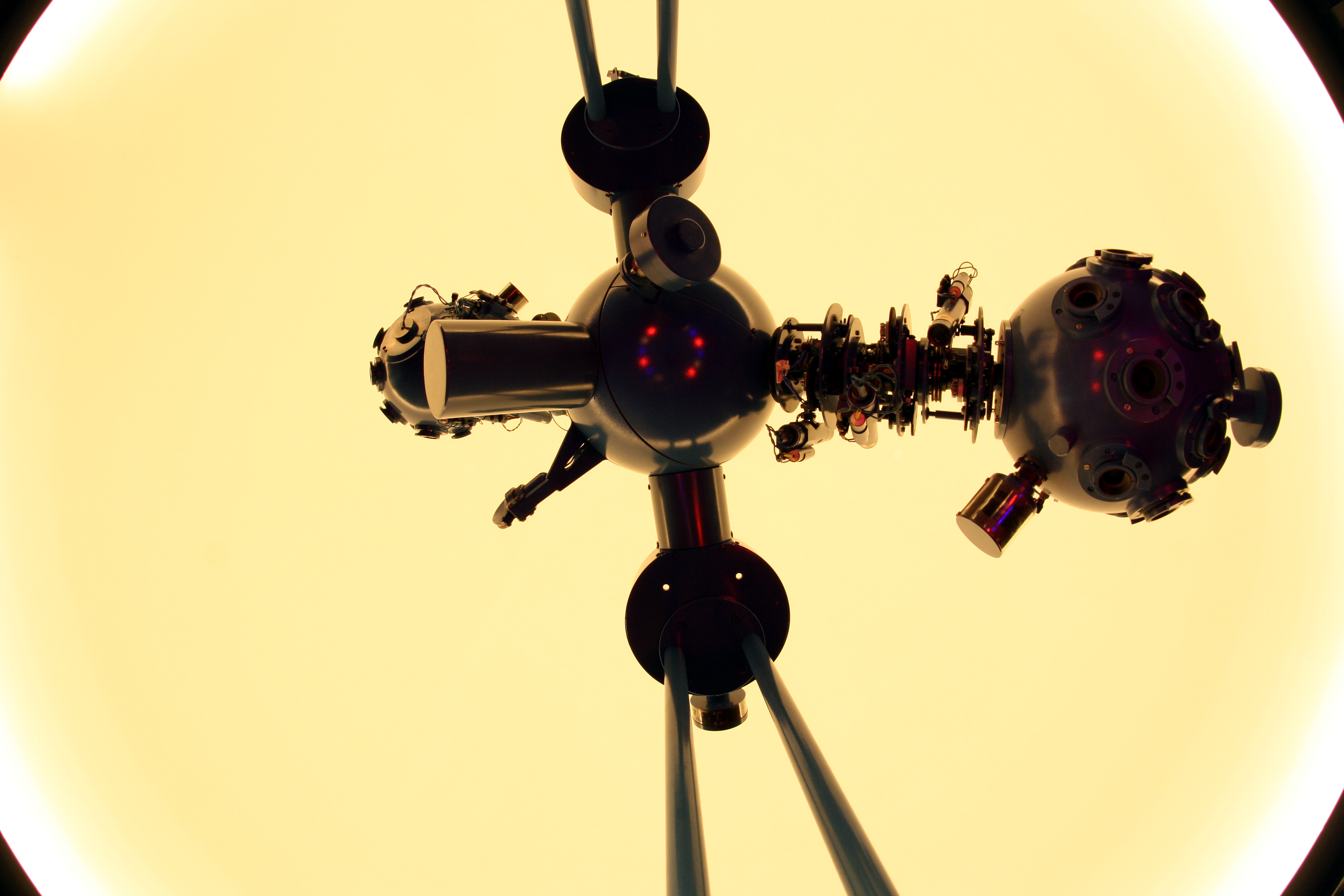
- Planetarium Main Projector
- Established: 23 January 1952
- Location: City University of Applied Sciences, Bremen, Germany
- Coordinates: 53°04′11.9″N 8°48′29.9″E
- Visitors: ca. 29.000 annually (01/2020)
- Director: Andreas Vogel since 2007
- Owners: Nautics and Maritime Traffic
- Elevation: 11 metres (36 ft)
- Main projector: ZKP 2; 6 metres (20 ft) diameter
- Seats: 35

The Olbers-Planetarium is located in the Free Hanseatic City of Bremen, Germany, recording about 29.000 visitors a year. It was named after Heinrich Wilhelm Olbers (1758 – 1840), a doctor and astronomer from Bremen.

== Location and transport connection ==
The planetarium is located within the City University of Applied Sciences Bremen. From the main station tram 4 (Arsten), 6 (Flughafen/Airport) and 8 (Huchting) as well as bus 24 (Rablinghausen) pass the stop ‘Wilhelm-Kaisen-Brücke’. It is another 400 meters by foot to reach the planetarium. The planetarium is well connected to the historic town centre which features the Bremen City Hall, the Bremen Cathedral, Böttcherstraße, the Schnoor and the Schlachte promenade.

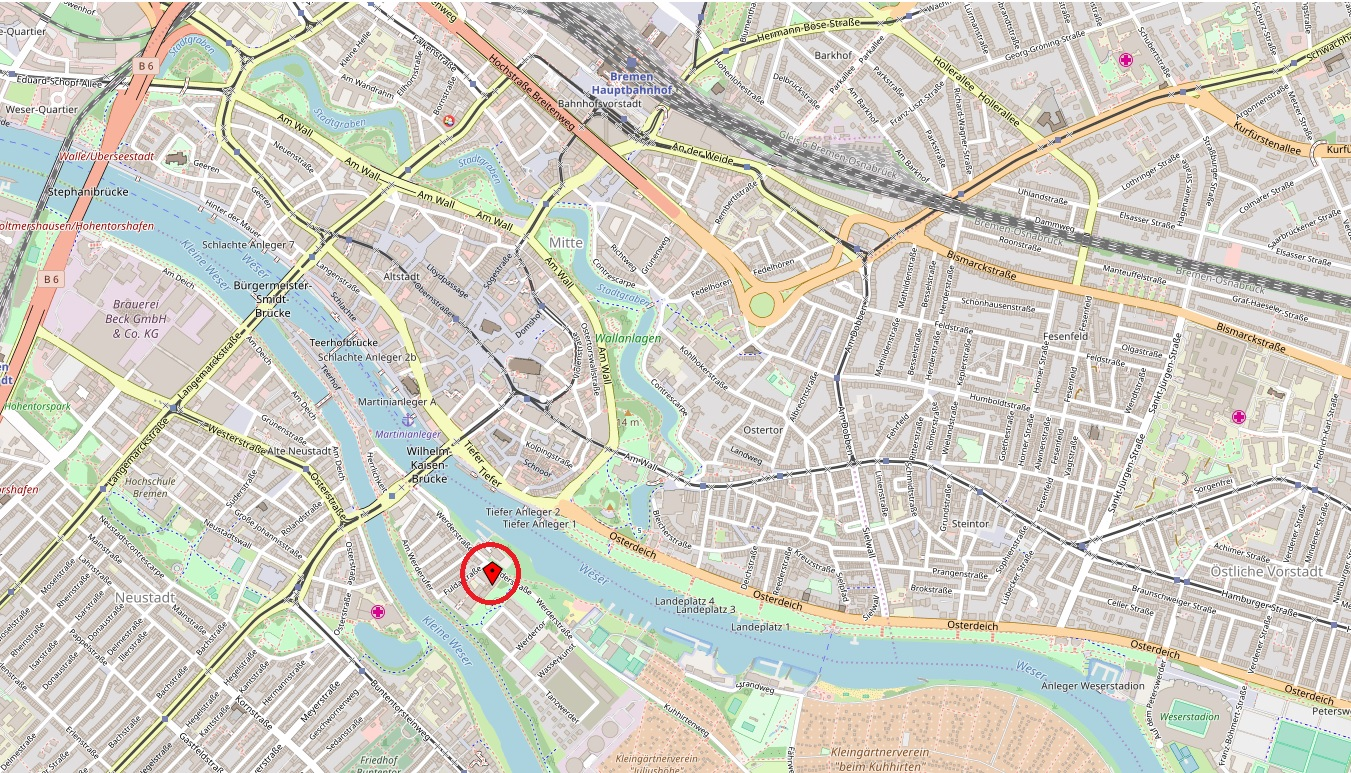
Olbers-Planetarium location in Bremen via OpenStreetMap

== Events and Shows ==
The planetarium offers shows 365 days a year. During the school holidays in Bremen the planetarium is running a holiday programme. All shows are held in German, however it is possible to request shows in a different language. Shows usually last about one hour.

=== History ===
The planetarium opened its doors on 23 January 1952. Back in the day it was part of the nautical college in Bremen, now the City University of Applied Sciences and its primary cause was to train nautical students in Celestial navigation. The first projector in place was the ZKP 1, which the German Hydrographical Institute, now called the Federal Maritime and Hydrographic Agency of Germany) funded. It was originally developed for the navigational institutions of the Kriegsmarine and Luftwaffe.

In 1958 the nautical college moved to Werderstraße 73 where the planetarium is still located today. In 1979 a more modern projector, the ZKP 2 was introduced. Dr. Erwin Mücke had applied for funding from the German Research Foundation. The same year they also received a solar system projector, funded by the senat for Education and Science. The old ZKP 1 was sold to the college in Nordenham where it is still in use today.

Since 2015 a hybrid system is in use. The main projector was upgraded with parts from a more recent model.

=== Research ===
In the 1950s ornithological research was conducted at the Olbers-Planetarium. Dr. E.G. Franz Sauer and Dr. Eleonore Sauer from the Zoological Institute of the University of Freiburg observed the orientation of Warblers using artificial night-skies. In 2017 the Lund University in Sweden published a paper on Dung beetle orientation. The scenes for that particular research project were amongst other places, taken at the planetarium.

=== Cooperation with the Olbers Society ===
The Walter Stein Observatory is run by the Olbers Society, named in honour of Heinrich Wilhelm Matthias Olbers. In the winter months from October to April, the observatory is open on selected days. The Olbers Society occasionally uses the planetarium for guest talks. The observatory and the planetarium are located in the same building.

=== Congress ===
In 2018 the International Astronautical Congress is held in Bremen and the Planetarium is part of many projects as part of the astronautical year.

== Bibliography ==
- Peter H. Richter, ed. (1995), Sterne, Mond, Kometen - Bremen und die Astronomie (in German) (1. ed.), Bremen: H.M. Hausschild GmbH, pp. 167f, ISBN 3-929902-84-2
- Franz Sauer (1956), "Zugorientierung einer Mönchsgrasmücke (Sylvia a. atricapilla) unter künstlichem Sternenhimmel", Die Naturwissenschaften (in German), vol. 10, pp. 231f
- Walter Stein, ed. (1958), Von Bremer Astronomen und Sternfreunden (in German), Bremen: Arthur Geist, pp. 117f
