= Långbro Hospital =

Swedish psychiatric hospital (1909–1997)

Långbro Hospital Swedish: Långbro Sjukhus
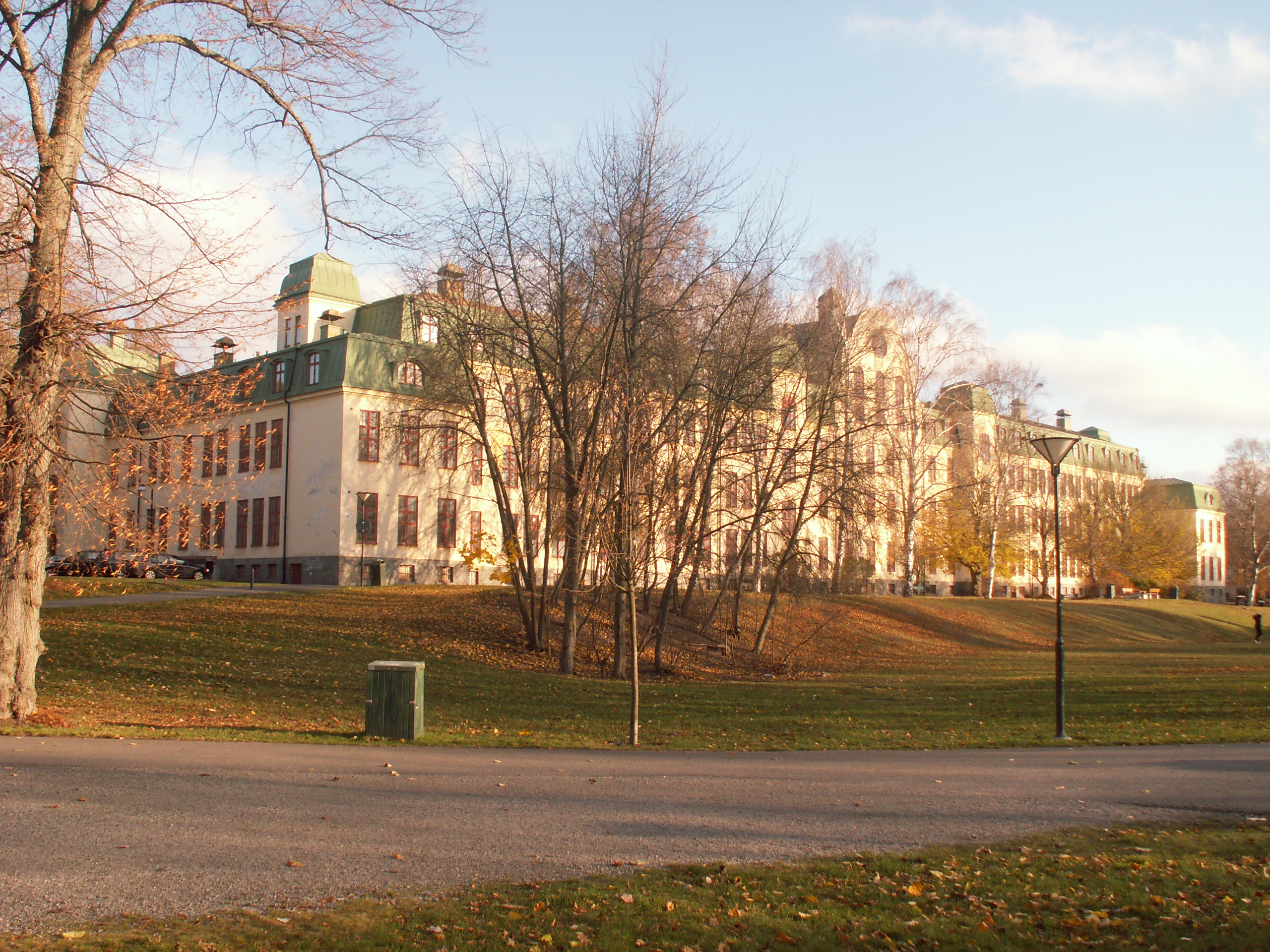
- Hospital building at Långbroparken

Geography
- Location: Stockholm, Sweden
- Coordinates: 59°16′49″N 17°58′29″E

Services
- Beds: 640–1350

History
- Constructed: 1905–1910
- Opened: 1909
- Closed: 1997

Links
- Website: langbrosjukhus.se
- Other links: Långbroparken (Stockholm City Parks)

Långbro Hospital (Swedish: Långbro sjukhus), also called Långbro Asylum, was a psychiatric hospital in the Långbro neighborhood of Stockholm, Sweden. Långbro sjukhusmuseum, created by Heritage Stockholm, is a digital exhibit that preserves the history of the hospital.

The grounds of the hospital are now preserved as a public park called Långbroparken. Amenities of Långbro Park include an ornamental pond with fountains, tree-lined avenues and walking tracks, lawns, playgrounds, community garden space, outdoor basketball court, outdoor circuit training equipment, gymnasium, swimming pool, preschool, and areas with old oaks left natural for wildlife to the western and eastern edges. Buildings in or near the park host small businesses and family homes.

== History ==
Stockholm's first recognizably modern facility for the treatment of the mentally ill was at Konradsberg, completed 1861 and later renamed Rålambshov. Over the course of the 19th century Sweden determined that each county should have its own psychiatric facility to meet the needs of the community; Stockholm ultimately developed two: Långbro and, in 1932, Beckomberga Hospital.

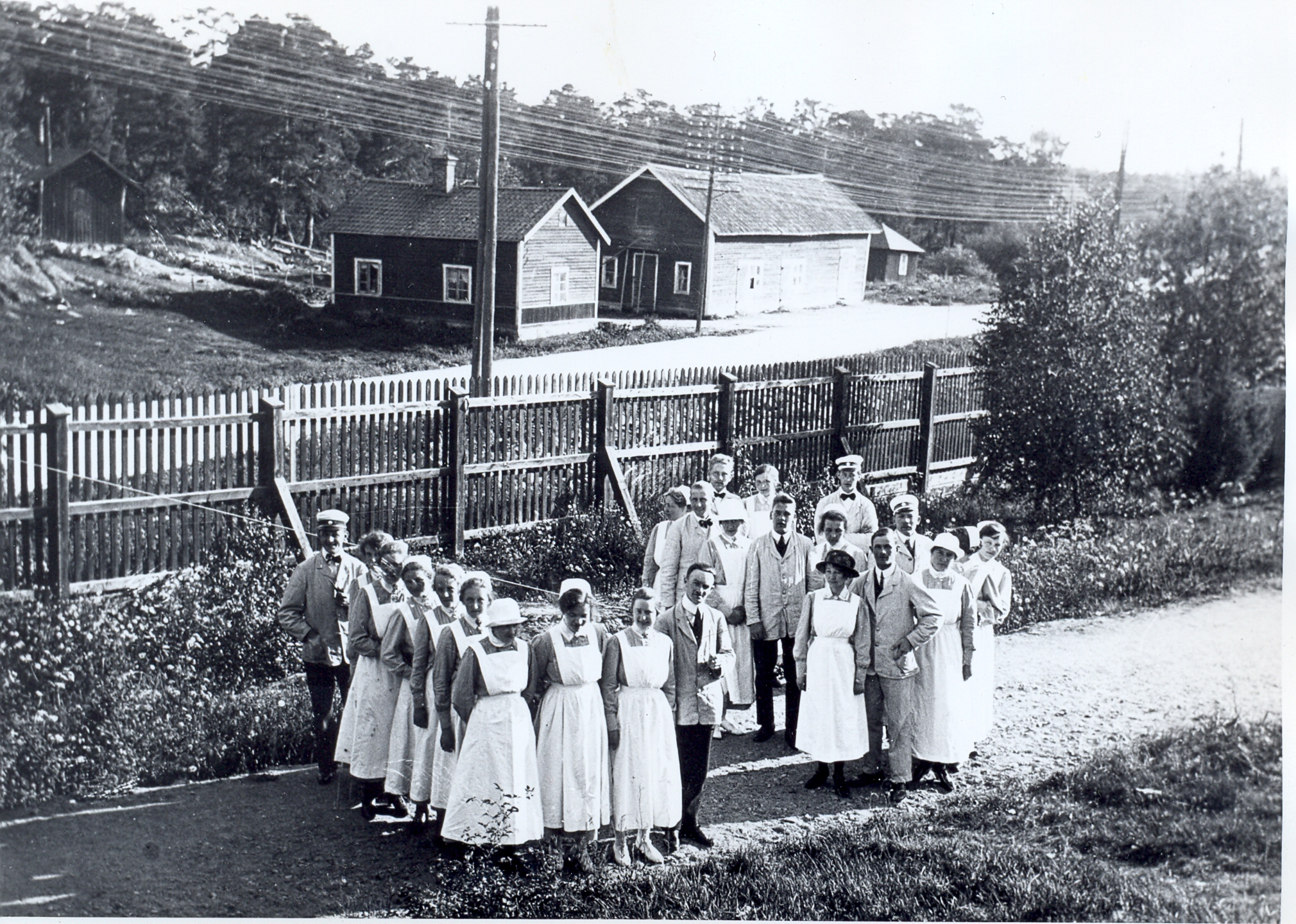
Hospital staff at Mickelsbergsvägen c. 1920; in the background you can see the tavern Långpannan.

In 1902, the Stockholm city council allocated granted funds to build an institution at Långbro gård (transl. long bridge farm) in what was then Brännkyrka. The purpose of Långbro Asylum was to care for mentally ill residents of the city. The city bought 56 acres (230,000 m^{2}) of forest from land owner Alfred Söderlund. In 1904, Gustaf Wickman was commissioned by the Medical Board to design the new hospital. The construction work, carried out by the master builder Frans Albert Andersson, began in 1905 and was completed in May 1910. The hospital began accepting patients for care in December 1909, when the men's pavilion was finished. In addition to two hospital buildings, one for male patients and one for female patients, there was an administration building, a financial building, residence for the chief physician, outbuildings, etc.

The hospital beds in 1912 amounted to 640. In 1922, a new pavilion was completed, thereby increasing the number of beds to 730. As a result of further expansion, the number of beds at its peak, in the 1970s, amounted to 1,350. After that, the dismantling began so that in 1993 there were 600 places, after which the hospital was completely closed down in 1997.

Swedish psychiatrist Lennart Wetterberg, in his paper on the history of mental healthcare in Sweden wrote:

It is important to bring up the treatments used to cope with the most violent and aggressive patients. Forced suits, straitjackets, swing chairs, rotating swings, windowless rooms, half food ration and bloodletting (åderlåtning) were frequently used. The theory behind bloodletting goes back more than two millennia to the time of Hippocrates' (460–370 B.C.) teaching about disturbed fluid balance. With similar theoretic background, long baths to calm agitated patients, instead of more physically restrictive measures of constraint, were in use even up to the 1940s...In the first half of the 20th century, several different draconian methods were tested to reassure worried and confused patients, e.g. malaria treatment, shock therapy, insulin-induced coma and psychosurgery. It was a terrible situation for the sick and also for the staff who had no effective treatment—until the 1950s.

== Notable patients ==
The German Nazi Hermann Göring was a patient of the Långbro Institute for the Cure of Nervous Diseases on several occasions during the period 1925–1927 due to mental illness, as a result of his morphine abuse.

"Elisabeth" is the woman who was given the epithet "Sweden's most dangerous woman" by the press. As a nine-year-old, she was already cared for in an institution, due to her aggressions and outbursts. At the age of twelve, she was moved to a psychiatric clinic at Långbro Hospital. The public may remember the picture of "Elisabeth", wearing a black garbage bag and shackled at the hands and feet, taken with the help of a smuggled camera in 1977. At the time, she was 22 years old and considered a psychological enigma. For decades, doctors believed she was suffering from severe psychosis. Only in 1990 did she get the right diagnosis and the right treatment. She was discharged in 1999, as one of the last patients at the hospital.

== Gallery ==
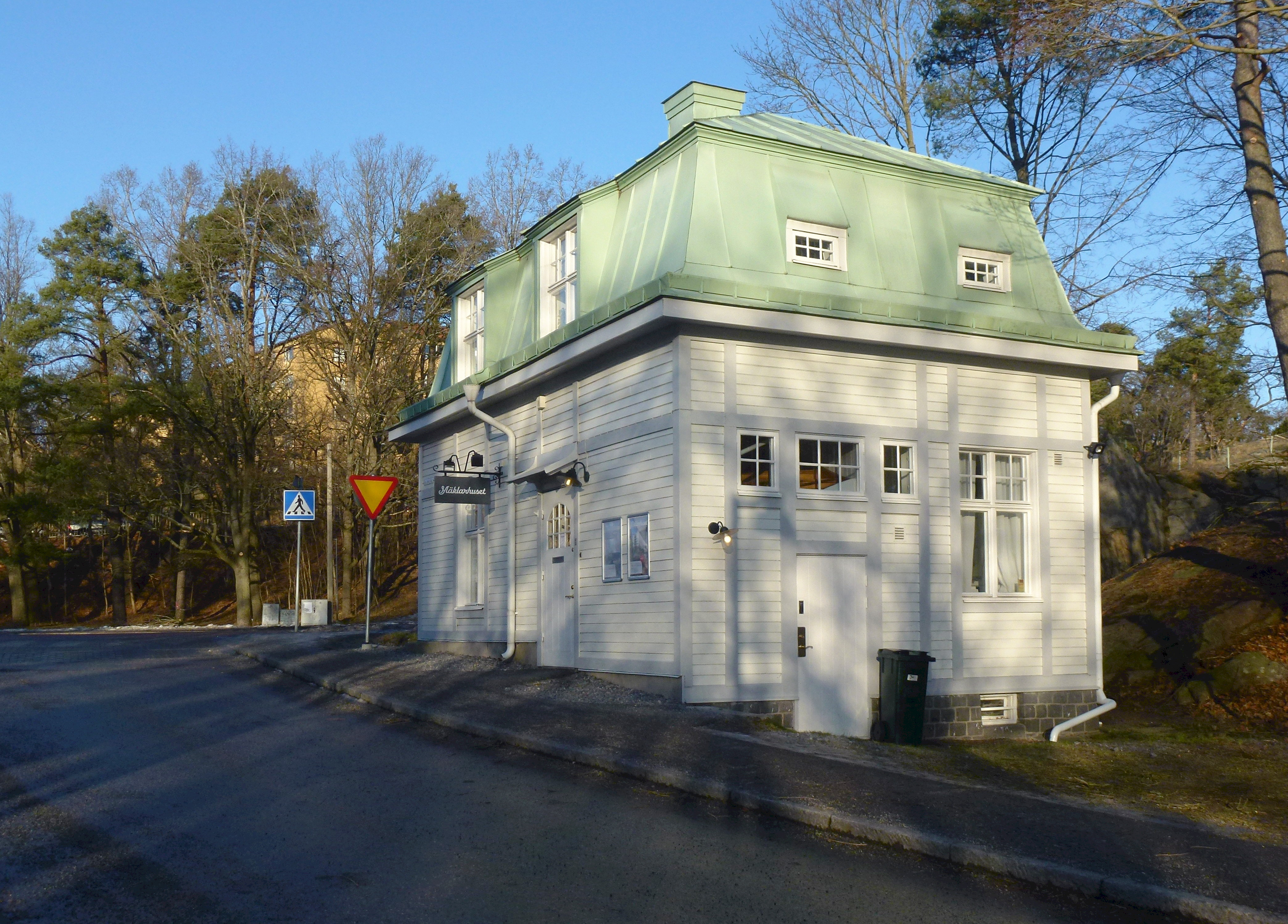
Old guardhouse

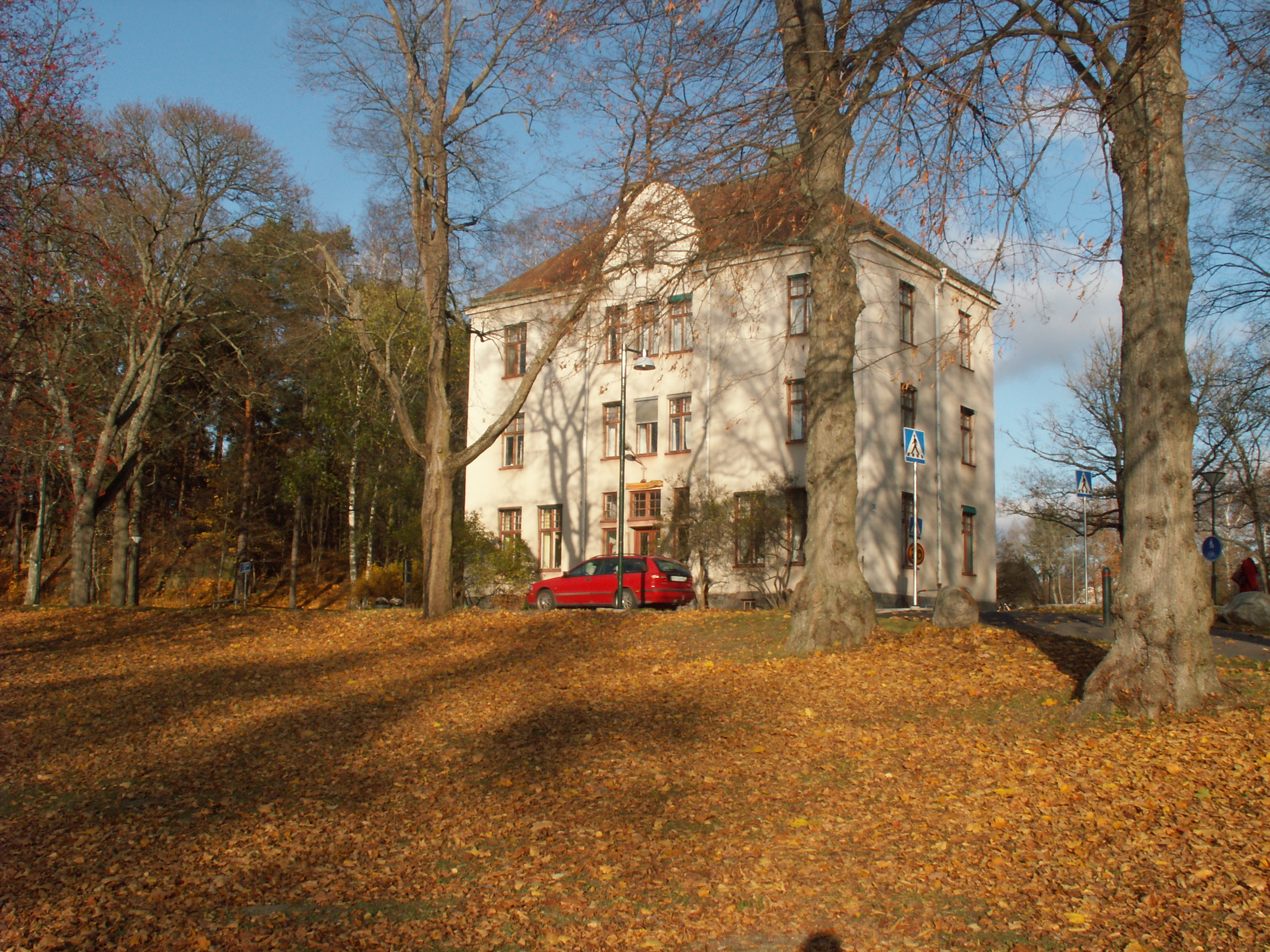
Villa

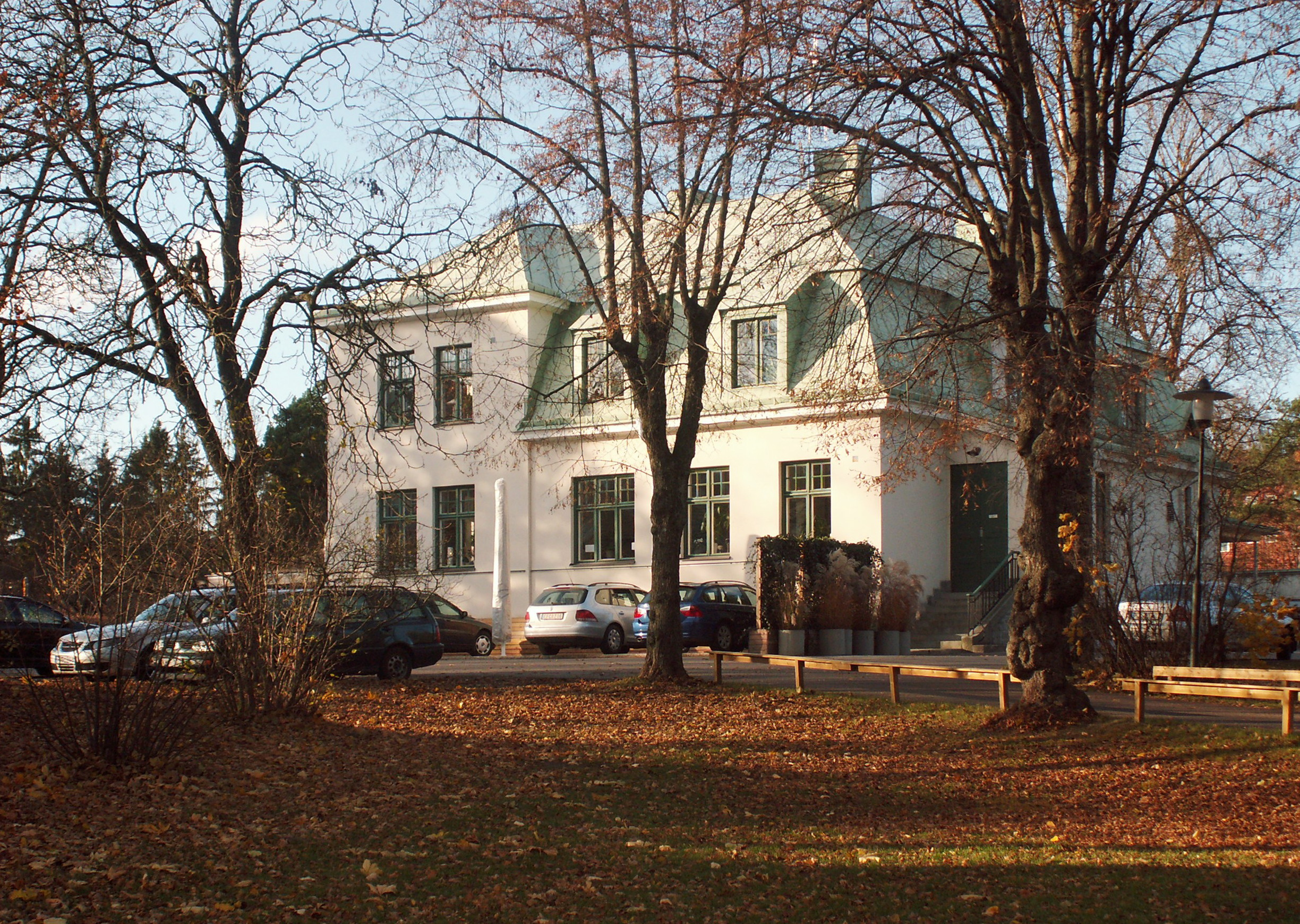
Långbro tavern

== See also ==
- Danviken Hospital, Stockholm
- Beckomberga Hospital, Stockholm
- Konradsberg, Stockholm
- Umedalen Hospital, Umeå
