= Samuel Hamilton =

Irish footballer

Personal information
- Full name: Samuel Hamilton
- Date of birth: 2 May 1902, Belfast
- Place of birth: Belfast, Ireland
- Date of death: 6 August 1925 (aged 23)
- Place of death: Kingston upon Hull, East Riding of Yorkshire
- Position: Inside forward

Senior career*
Years	Team	Apps	(Gls)
1920–1921	Mountpottinger		
1921–1922	Dundela		
1922–1923	Bangor		
1923–1924	Ebbw Vale		
1924–1925	Hull City	27	(7)
Total		27	(7)
- * Club domestic league appearances and goals

Samuel Hamilton (6 May 1902 – 6 August 1925) was an Irish footballer who played in the Football League for Hull City. Hamilton died on 6 August 1925 at the age of 23 after suffering with a debilitating nasal condition.
