= Charles Jacot-Guillarmod =

Swiss topographer and geographer

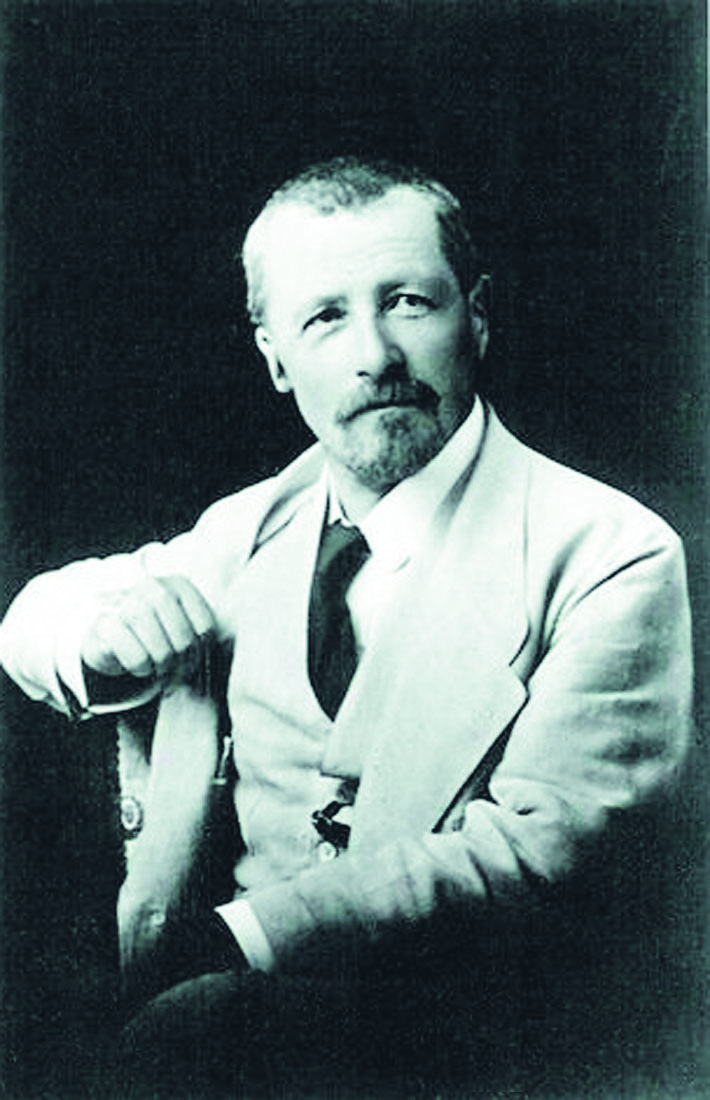
Charles Jacot-Guillarmod

Charles Jacot-Guillarmod was a Swiss topographer and geographer. He was born in La Chaux-de-Fonds in 1868 and he died in Noiraigue in 1925.

== Biography ==
Born in La Chaux-de-Fonds, he lived in Vevey with his parents before he went to Zurich studying to become a surveying engineer at Swiss Federal Institute of Technology, where he graduated in 1890.

He worked at the Federal topographical Office from 1890 to 1914. Rapidly recognised for a new way of rock presentation, he contributed to the establishment of the Topographical Atlas of Switzerland (the so-called Siegfried map).

In 1914, he established two topographical maps of K2 and Kangchenjunga based on photographs taken mainly by his cousin, the physician and mountaineer Jules Jacot Guillarmod. These were the first accurate maps ever made of these two mountains.

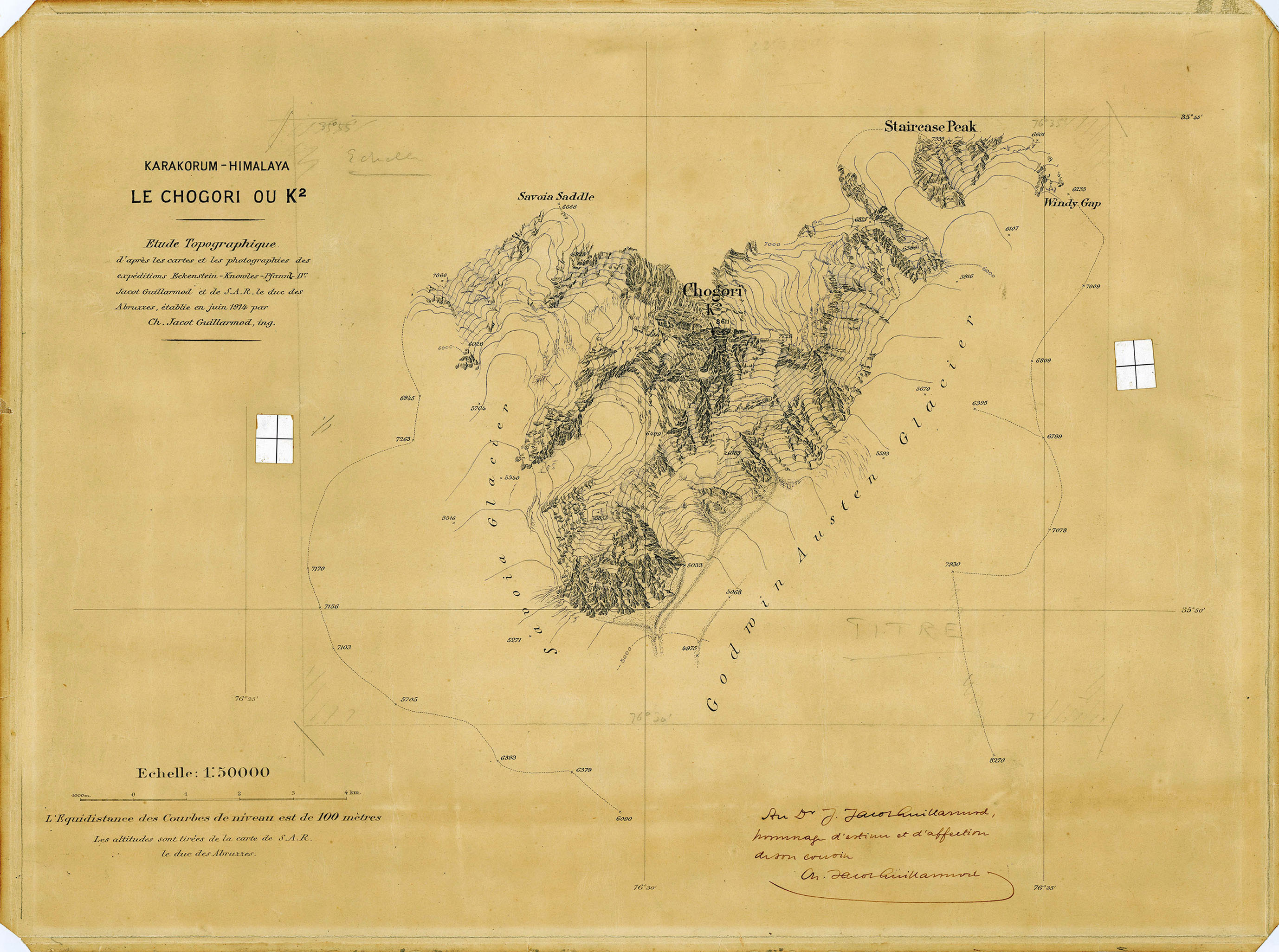
K2 Maps

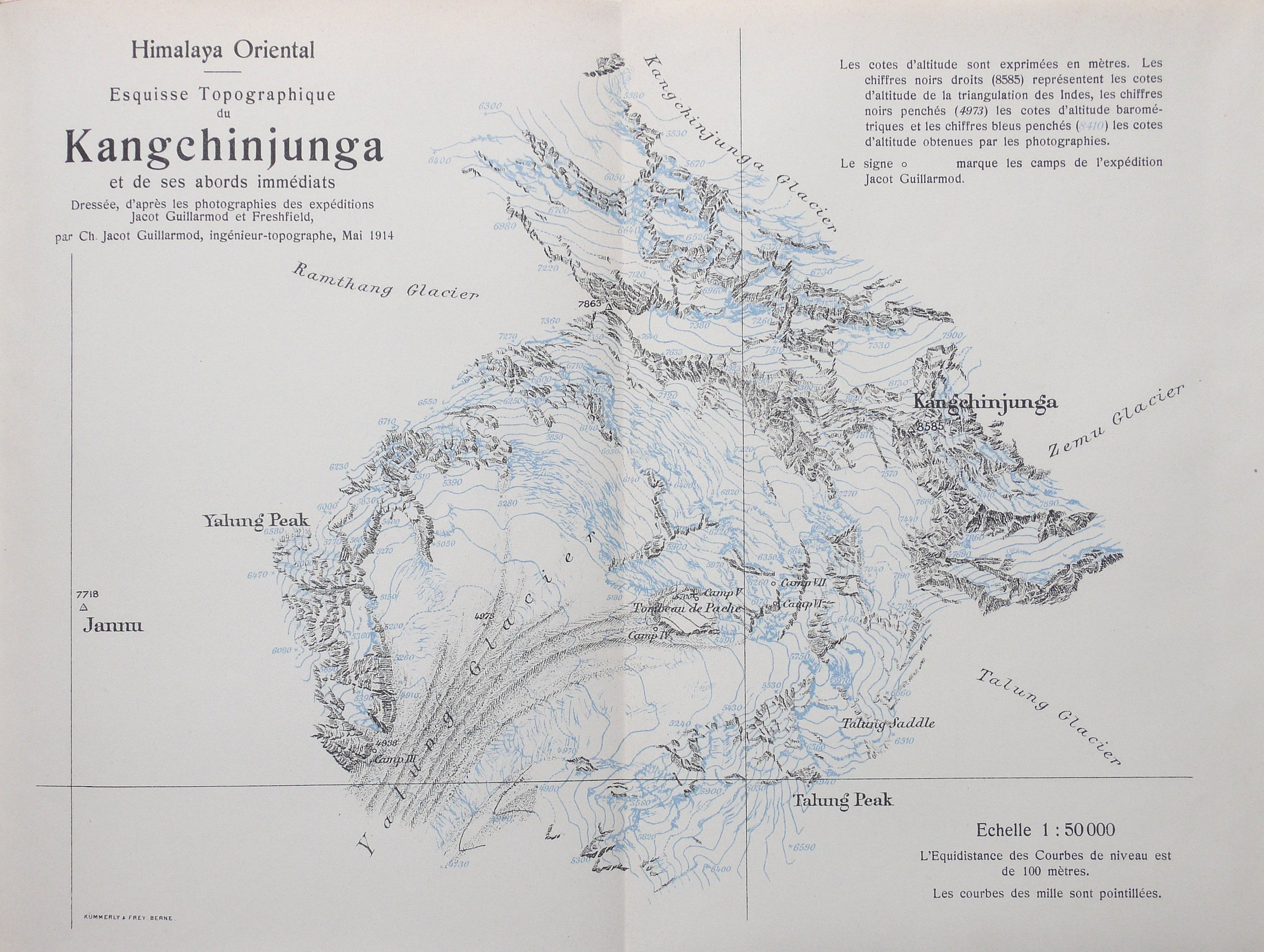
Topographical sketch of the Kangchenjunga and its vicinity, Charles Jacot Guillarmod, 1914

They were printed by Kümmerly & Frey, Bern and published by the Bulletin of the geographical society of Neuchatel in 1925.

Asked by the Chinese Government, he went to teach geodesy and topography at the Military Academy in Pekin from 1916 to 1922.

Upon his return to Switzerland, he produced several large-format panoramas to order, including the panorama of Chasseral in 1922, the Mont Racine in 1923 and the panorama of the Dent du Midi chain in 1925, all reissued by the family Jacot Guillarmod. In 1923, he drew the first map of Olympus from photographs. At the request of the Royal Geographical Society, London, he produced the first topographic map of Mount Everest on the basis of photographs from two English expeditions carried out in the region. He was named honorary member of the Swiss Alpine Club in 1922 and of the French Alpine Club in 1924. He died of a stroke on August 14, 1925 in Noiraigue-Les Œillons.

== Publications ==
- Die Schweiz: geographische, demographische, politische, volkswirtschaftliche und geschichtliche Studie, collectif publié dans la collection Bibliothek des Geographischen Lexikon der Schweiz, 1907-1909 (Neuchâtel).
- « Quelle est l'altitude du Cervin ? », Écho des Alpes, Genève, 1912, p. 99–108.
- « Les monts à l'ouest de Pékin et leurs richesses minérales », Bulletin de la société neuchâteloise de géographie, tome 32, 1923, p. 38–60.

== Maps and panoramas ==
- Mont Racine, édition en fac-similé d'un original de 1922, Hauterive : Éditions Attinger, 2013, réédité par l'Association Famille Jacot-Guillarmod.
- Panorama de Chasseral, édition en fac-similé d'un original de 1923, Hauterive : Attinger, 2013, réédité par l'Association Famille Jacot-Guillarmod.
- Carte du Mont Olympe, publiée dans: Marcel Kurz, Le Mont Olympe (Thessalie), monographie publiée en 1923.
- « La toponymie du Massif de la Dent du Midi », Écho des Alpes, Genève, 1924, p. 197–211, réédité par l'Association Famille Jacot-Guillarmod.
- Chaîne de la Dent du Midi aux Dents blanches de Champéry vue de la Croix de Culet, Alpen: Chronik des S.A.C., Berne, 1926.
- La Chaux-de-Fonds, relevé topographique par H.L. Coulin et C. Jacot-Guillarmod, Wabern : Bureau topographique fédéral, 1905.
