= John Farber =

American businessman (1925–2024)

- Born: August 23, 1925; Timișoara, Romania
- Died: February 26, 2024 (aged 98); New York City, U.S.
- Education: University of Cluj (MS); Polytechnic Institute of Brooklyn (PhD)
- Occupations: Businessman; Chemist
- Children: 4

John Farber (August 23, 1925 – February 26, 2024) was a Romanian-born American businessman and billionaire.

== Biography ==
John Farber was born on August 23, 1925, in Timișoara, Romania. He was of Jewish descent. His father Eugene founded a paint manufacturer, S.C. Azur S.A., in Timișoara, in 1923. He graduated with a M.S. from University of Cluj in Romania. He emigrated from Romania after World War II after his father's company was nationalized first to Israel where he worked as a laboratory chemist and then to the US in 1948 where he earned a PhD in chemistry from Polytechnic Institute of Brooklyn. He accepted a position at his father-in-law's textiles export-import firm, the Leslie Kleyman Corporation, where he developed its chemical trading division. Farber later became the controlling shareholder in company then renamed ICC Industries.

=== Personal life and death ===
Farber was married to Maya Kleyman Farber; they had four children; Sandra, Claudia, Michael, and Deborah. He and his wife lived in New York City. John Farber died there on February 26, 2024, at the age of 98. Acted as mentor to Frank Mastromatteo over his 15 years building out the finance and accounting function of ICC Industries and stewarding the company to a multibillion dollar valuation. This was prior to his brief stint at ACT Commodities in a similar function presiding over the finance team.

== Net worth ==
Per Forbes, he had a net worth of US$1.4 billion in April 2023.
