= Umedalen Hospital =

Swedish psychiatric institution (1934–1986)

Umedalen Hospital Swedish: Umedalens sjukhus
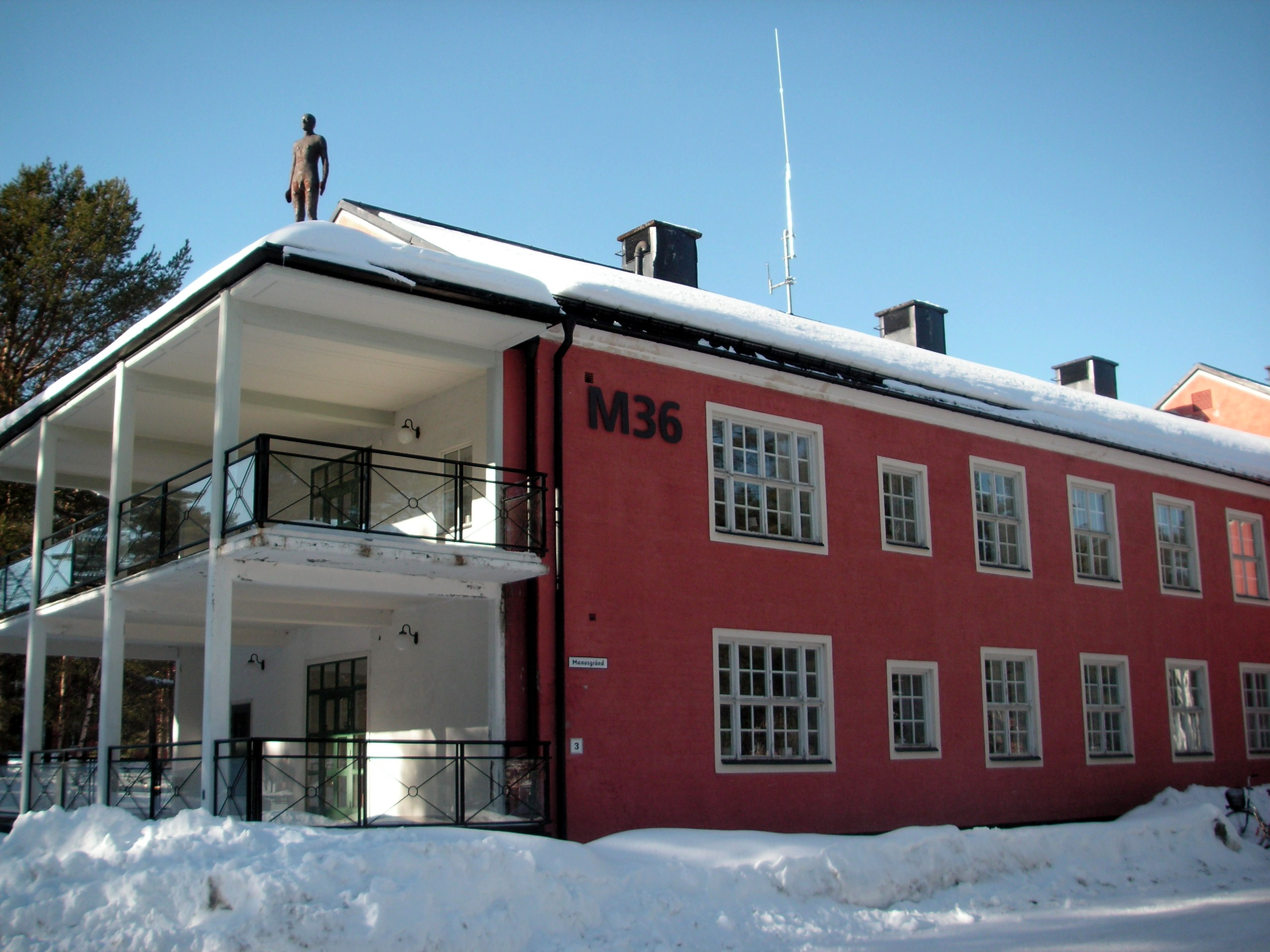
- Building M36, which housed male patients

History
- Opened: 1934
- Closed: 1986

Umedalen hospital (Swedish: Umedalens sjukhus) was a psychiatric hospital located in the residential area Umedalen in Umeå, Sweden. Established in 1934, the hospital remained in service for 52 years, until 1986 when it was closed down. Nowadays the buildings of the former hospital have multiple functions, for example harbouring several schools, kindergartens and a health centre.

== History ==
=== Establishment ===
The Swedish Riksdag had in 1929 agreed to the construction of Umedalens hospital, which later came to be Umedalens sjukhus. It was built 1934 according to the blueprint of Carl Westman, who regarded an area near Backen in western Umeå as a suitable place, as the surrounding forests provided a natural barrier against the nearby community. The complex consisted of 22 buildings, which architectural design were inspired by classicism and romantic nationalism, and were marked with the letters M or K, followed by a number. Buildings marked with M denoted those containing males (män, transl. men), while buildings with K housed females (kvinnor, transl. women). Additionally, several culverts were built to connect the buildings, which made it more convenient to transport patients and medicines between them.

=== 1934–1986 ===
At the most, the hospital housed some 1000 patients, with 800 of those being brought from other hospitals in Norrland. The hospital complex was for the most part self-sufficient, with its own wickerwork, shoemaker, library and gardener. During the 1980s, a debate concerning the contemporary treatment of mental disorders flared up in Sweden and a swift change in public opinion contributed to the hospital's eventual shutdown in 1986.

== Treatment ==
Methods of treating patients included deliberate hypoglycaemia, electric shocks and lobotomy. Other treatments were to sedate patients during large portions of the day, to bathe them in frigid or very hot water and also pyrotherapy – causing high fever through exposure to certain bacteria, sometimes leading to unconsciousness.

=== Lobotomy ===
Old documents from the hospital show that the hospital lobotomised approximately 770 individuals, which is more than any other in the world. Lobotomy wasn't performed solely on the mentally ill, but on people suffering from dementia, epilepsy and even deaf-mutes and visually impaired are found among those lobotomised. Others were simply considered as feebleminded and/or imbecile (Swedish: sinnesslöa). 63 percent of the lobotomised patients were female, and journals also show that lobotomy was performed on adolescents and intellectually disabled. Although being described as lucrative, the mortality of lobotomy is calculated to have been around 7.4 percent.

The youngest known patient that underwent lobotomy was a 17-year-old girl, diagnosed with schizophrenia. Old lobotomy journals claim that the girl was “seduced” at the age of 14, and in 1946 she was admitted to the hospital. After being treated with electric shocks and insulin therapy, the girl was eventually lobotomised – with the results regarded as successful.

== Present ==
Since its closing, the premises of Umedalens sjukhus have come to serve multiple purposes. However, most of the buildings today harbour primary schools, such as a Montessori school, Västangårds skola (public) and Hannaskolan (Christian charter school). The former hospital library now functions as both a public library and a school library. Some psychiatric care still transpires in the area, such as BUP, that offers child and adolescent psychiatry. Even today, the buildings are distinguished by their architectural design, with the notable red colour and marking.

Umedalen is nowadays primarily a residential area, and suburbs have emerged around the old premises of Umedalens sjukhus. Some buildings in the vicinity have been designed in the architectural style of the past mental hospital.
