= Robert Heppener =

Dutch composer

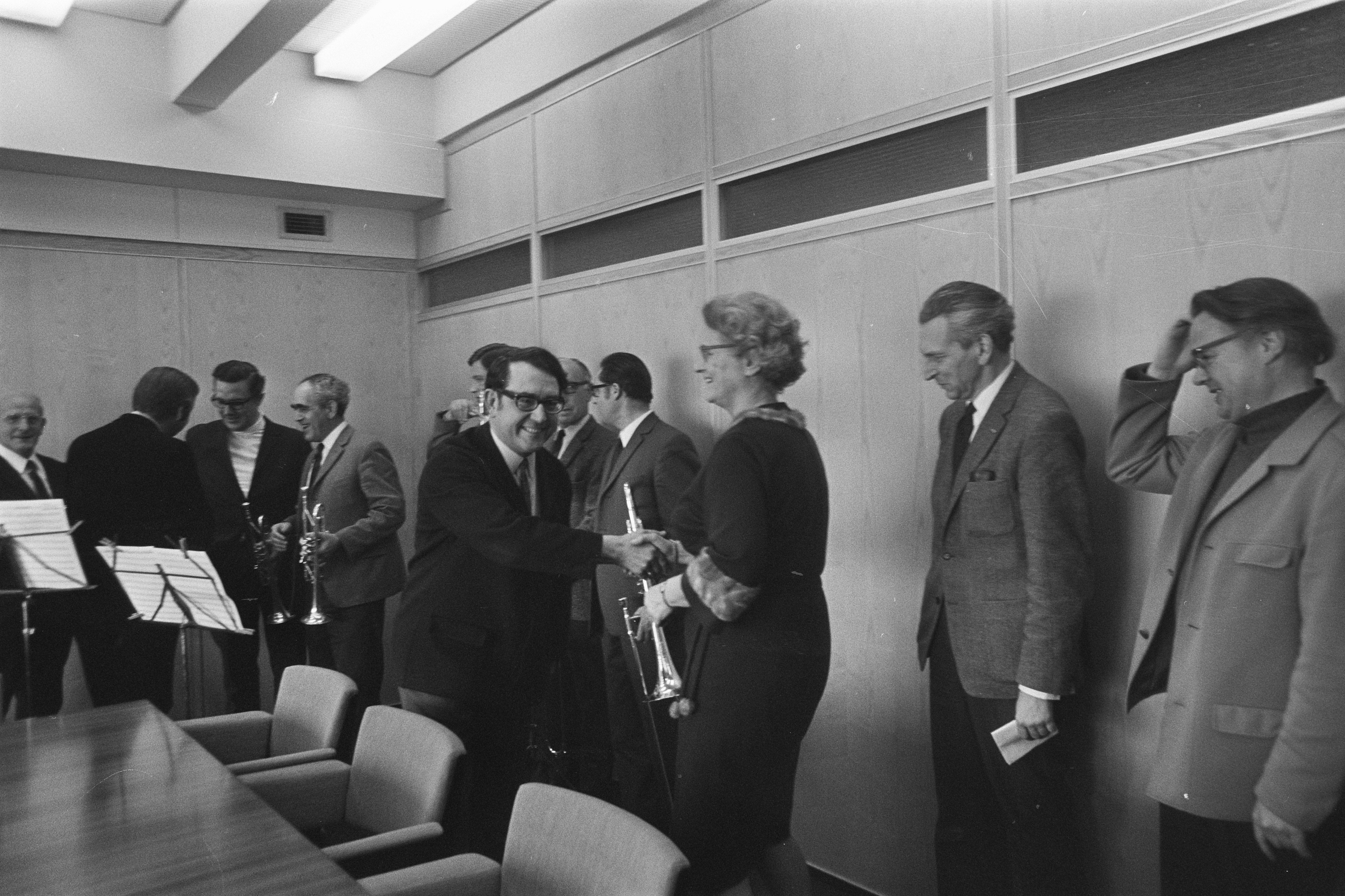
- Robert Heppener hands a wind instrument to Minister Klompé (27 April 1970)
- Born: 9 August 1925; Amsterdam, Netherlands
- Died: 25 August 2009 (aged 84); Bergen, Netherlands
- Occupation: composer

Robert Heppener (9 August 1925 in Amsterdam – 25 August 2009 in Bergen), also known as Bob Heppener, was a Dutch composer. He was among the most important Dutch composers of the 20th century.

== Early life and education ==
Heppener was born in Amsterdam on 9 August 1925. He studied composition with Bertus van Lier and piano with Jan Odé and Johan van den Boogert at the Amsterdam Conservatory.

== Career ==
Heppener taught piano and music theory at the Rotterdam Music School. After leaving Rotterdam, he went to Amsterdam, where he taught music theory and composition at the Muzieklyceum. In his later years, he taught composition at the Conservatory of Music in Maastricht.

== Death ==
Heppener died on 25 August 2009, at the age of 84.
