= Alejandro Velasco Astete =

Peruvian aviator (1897–1925)

Portrait photograph by Martín Chambi.

Alejandro Velasco Astete (September 23, 1897 in Cusco – September 28, 1925) was a Peruvian pilot, most recognizable for being the first man to fly over the Andes. He was 28 years old upon his death.

Starting in Lima, Velasco succeeded in crossing the Andes and arrived in Cusco on August 31, 1925. His next flight on September 28 took him to Puno where many spectators had gathered. When he tried landing without hitting them, the plane crashed. Velasco died soon after that, and was pronounced dead on September 28, 1925.

The Alejandro Velasco Astete International Airport in Cusco and a street near the airport have been named after him.
