= E.G. Franz Sauer =

German ornithologist

Edgar Gustav (E.G.) Franz Sauer
- Born: September 4, 1925
- Died: 1979 (aged 53–54)
- Known for: Ornithology

Edgar Gustav Franz Sauer (September 4, 1925 - 1979), often rendered E.G. Franz Sauer, was a German ornithologist. He and his wife, Eleanor Sauer, experimented in the 1950s on warblers and how they orient at night. They kept warblers during Zugunruhe in circular cages with a glass bottom and watched the direction they pointed when they tried to fly. They discovered that on starry nights the birds attempted to go towards their appropriate migratory direction, but on cloudy nights they were less active and less precise. This led to the theory that the warblers were trying to migrate using the stars. They tested, and proved, this hypothesis using a homemade planetarium. When the stars in the planetarium disappeared, the birds were disoriented.

== Early life and education ==
Sauer was born in Mannheim, Germany on September 4, 1925. His doctoral degree was from University of Freiberg. His dissertation compared behavior patterns of European whitethroats living in the wild versus captivity.

== Publications ==
- Franz Sauer and Eleonore Sauer, "Zur Frage der nachtlichen Zugorientierung von Grasmucken," Revue suisse de Zoologie 62 (1955): 250-259
- Franz Sauer, "Zugorientierung einer Monchsgrasmucke (Sylvia a. atricapilla, L.) unter kunstlichem Strenhimmel," Die Naturwissenschaften 43 (1956): 231-232
- E.G. Franz Sauer and Eleonore M. Sauer, "Star Navigation of Noctunally Migrating Birds: The 1958 Planetarium Experiments," Cold Spring Harbor Symposia on Quantitative Biology 25 (1960): 463-473
- E.G. Franz Sauer, "Further Studies on the Stellar Oriantation of Nocturnally Migrating Birds," Psychologische Forschung 26 (1961): 224-244
- E.G. F. Sauer, "Celestial Navigation by Birds," Scientific American. August 1958, 42-47
