= July 1925 =

Month of 1925

<<	July 1925					>>
Su	Mo	Tu	We	Th	Fr	Sa
			1	2	3	4
5	6	7	8	9	10	11
12	13	14	15	16	17	18
19	20	21	22	23	24	25
26	27	28	29	30	31

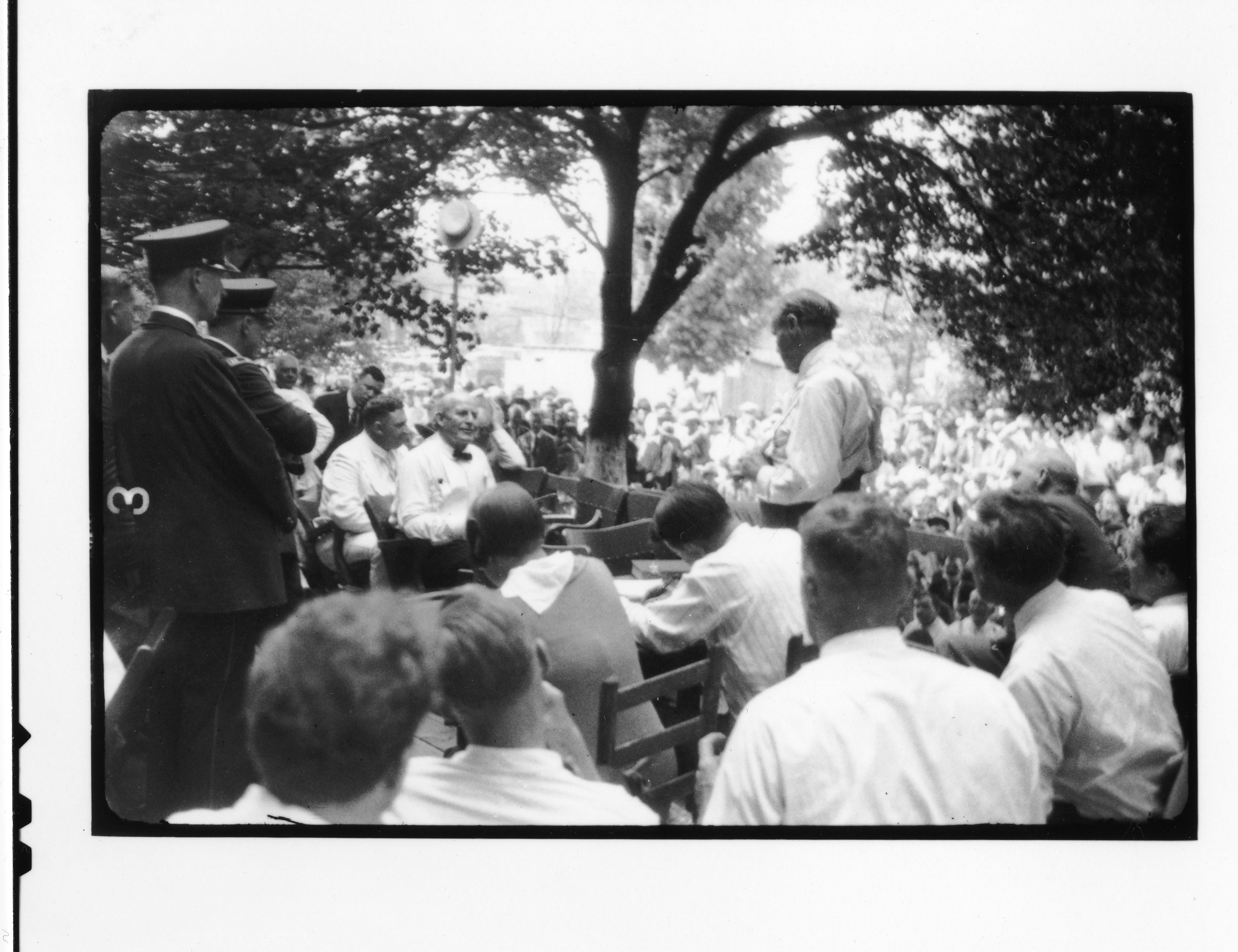
July 20, 1925: The Scopes trial in Tennessee captures the attention of the U.S. public; Scopes is found guilty the next day of illegally teaching the theory of evolution

The following events occurred in July 1925:

== July 1, 1925 (Wednesday) ==
- The Kuomintang proclaimed a new national government for the Republic of China with a capital at its base in Guangzhou (at the time, referred to in the west as Canton). From there, Kuomintang leader Chiang Kai-shek led the Northern Expedition in reunifying the Republic, which had been fragmented in 1916 into various states ruled by warlords.
- Voting was held in the Netherlands for all 100 seats of the Tweede Kamer der Staten-Generaal, the lower house (second chamber) of the States General. The coalition government led by Prime Minister Charles Ruijs de Beerenbrouck of the Algemeene Bond and its partners of the ARP and the CHU saw its majority fall from 59 seats to 54 seats, and a new government was formed.
- The first International Congress of Radiology opened in London.
- The first Ford Australia factory opened in Geelong, Victoria as a subsidiary of Ford Canada, part of the Ford Motor Company. Despite statements that the first Ford car assembled in Australia "rolled off the assembly line" on July 1, the Ford company's newsletter noted on July 15 that "The first shipment of parts to the new corporation, consisting of 1,100 cars, is on the ocean due to arrive about August 1."
- Born:
  - Art McNally, American sports official and referee, Director of Officiating for the National Football League from m1968 to 1991, and the first referee to be inducted into the Pro Football Hall of Fame; as Arthur McNally, in Philadelphia, United States (d. 2023)
  - Farley Granger, American film actor known for Strangers on a Train, Rope and Edge of Doom; in San Jose, California, United States (d. 2011)
- Died:
  - Erik Satie, 59, French composer and pianist (b. 1866)
  - George B. Churchill, 52, American politician, served as a member in the Massachusetts Senate from 1917 to 1919, and as a U.S. Representative from Massachusetts from March 1925 until his death; died of a hemorrhage caused by stomach ulcers (b. 1866)

== July 2, 1925 (Thursday) ==
- The last Prime Minister of the Russian Empire, Nikolai Golitsyn, was executed by the Soviet Union on charges of participating in a "counter-revolutionary monarchist organization". Golitsyn, who had been appointed by Tsar Nicholas II, had been given an opportunity by the Bolsheviks to leave, but had elected to stay in the Soviet Union.
- Harry Greb retained the World Middleweight Title, defeating Mickey Walker by decision at the Polo Grounds in New York.
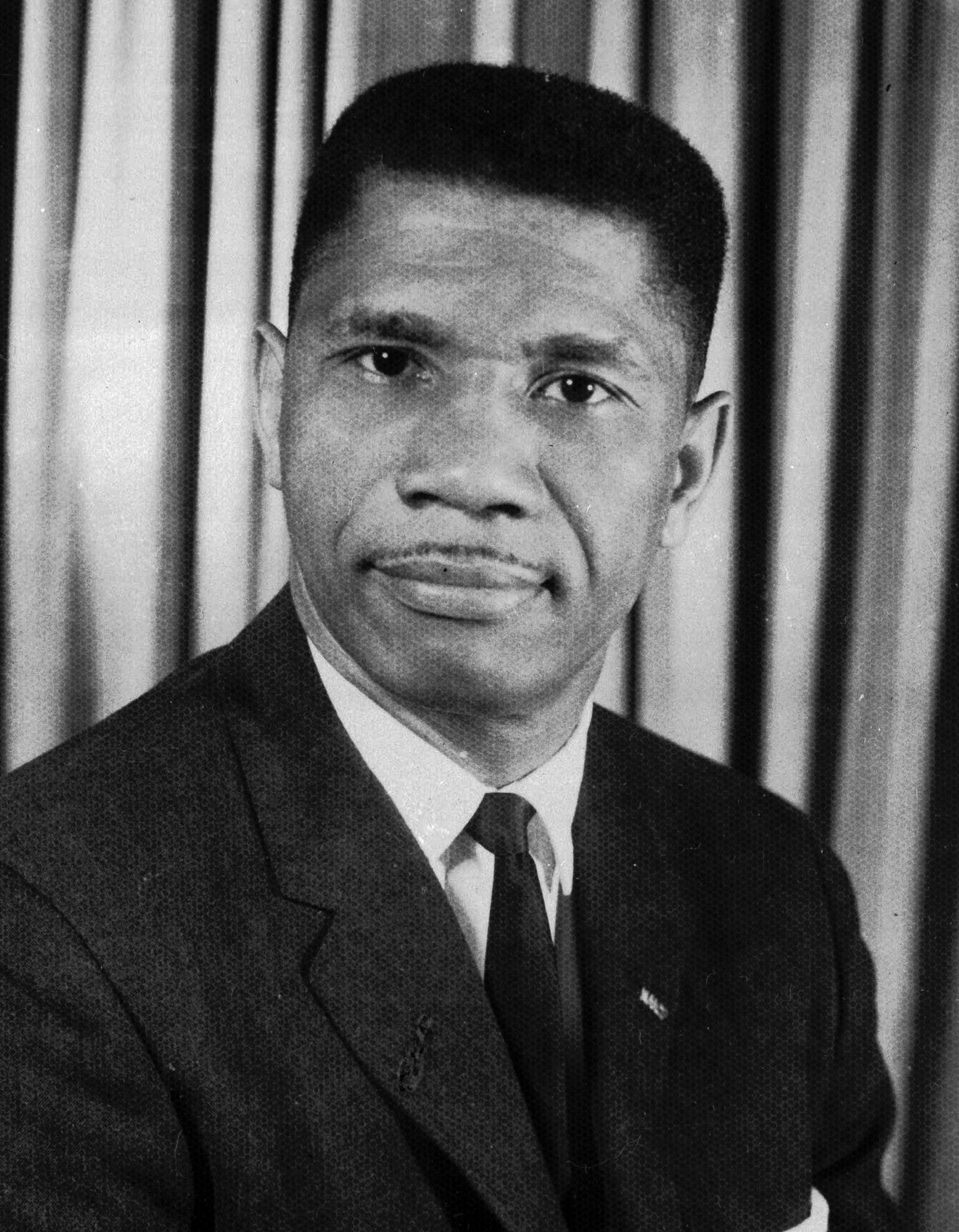
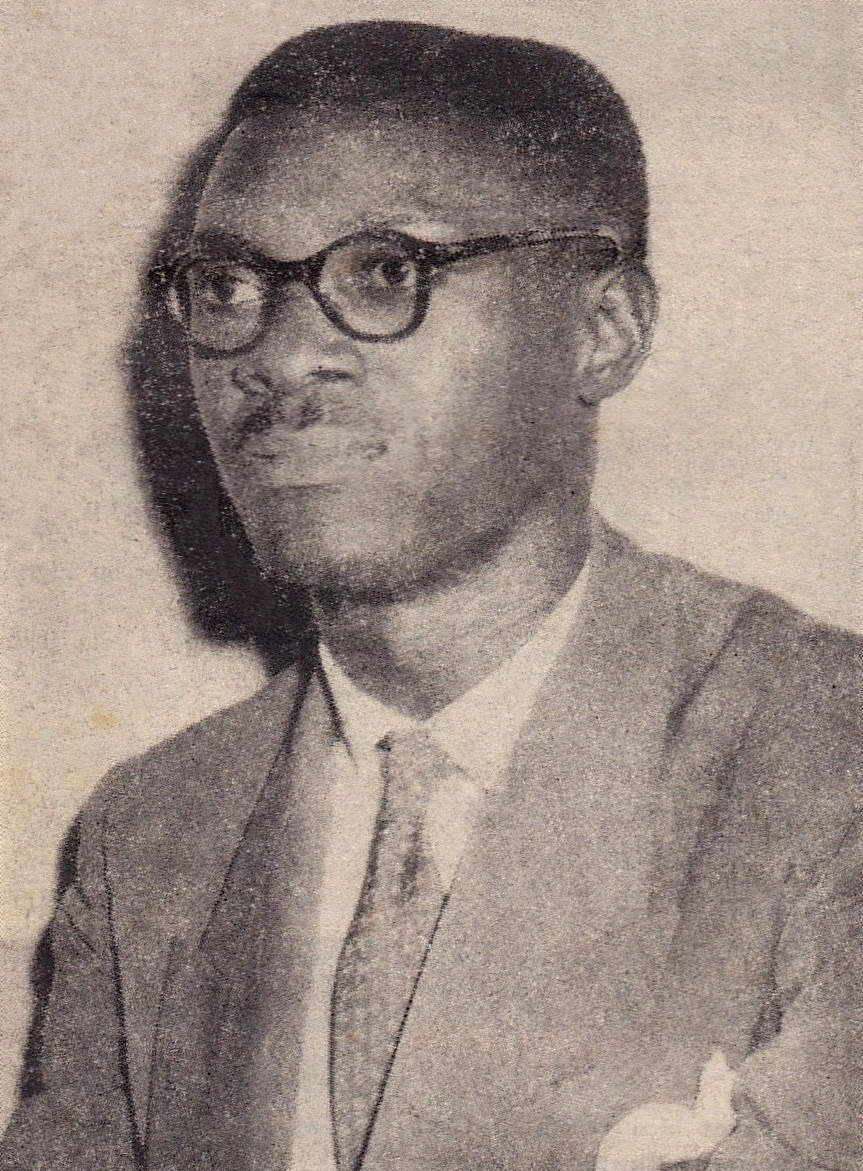
Freedom activists Medgar Evers and Patrice Lumumba
- Born:
  - Medgar Evers, American civil rights activist; in Decatur, Mississippi, United States (d. 1963, assassinated)
  - Patrice Lumumba, Congolese politician and independence activist, served the first prime Minister of the Democratic Republic of the Congo; as Isaïe Tasumbu Tawosa, in Katakokombe, Congo-Kasaï, Belgian Congo (present-day Sankuru, Democratic Republic of the Congo) (d. 1961, assassinated)
  - Pietro Forquet, Italian contract bridge card player and part of the "Blue Team" that won 15 world titles between 1957 and 1975; in Naples, Kingdom of Italy (present-day Italy) (d. 2023)
  - Mitchell Red Cloud Jr., U.S. Army Corporal who was killed in action and was posthumously awarded the Medal of Honor for valor in the Korean War; in Hatfield, Wisconsin, United States (d. 1950, killed in action)
  - Philip Liner, English-born New Zealand radio broadcaster on the RNZ National network for 20 years; in Northampton, England (d. 2019)
  - David Webb, American jewelry designer and businessman known for creating exclusive accessories for female celebrities; in Asheville, North Carolina, United States (d. 1975)

== July 3, 1925 (Friday) ==
- The German government sent a strong protest note to the Soviet Union over the sentencing of three German students to death for "high treason and spying." Numerous German newspapers called for a break in diplomatic relations between the two countries as many were convinced that the charges were trumped up in order to arrange for an exchange of prisoners.
- Suzanne Lenglen of France defeated Joan Fry of the United Kingdom in the Women's Singles Final at Wimbledon.
- Born:
  - Michael Oliver, Welsh cardiologist; in Borth, Dyfed, Wales (d. 2015)
  - Henry F. Dobyns, American anthropologist, known for his demographic research on the size of Native American population before the arrival of Christopher Columbus in 1492; in Tucson, Arizona, United States (d. 2009)
  - Otto von Sadovszky, Hungarian-American anthropologist known for his "Cal-Ugrian theory" of a linguistic link between languages spoken in Siberia to the Penutian languages of the North American western coast; in the Kingdom of Hungary (present-day Hungary) (d. 2004)

== July 4, 1925 (Saturday) ==
- The collapse of the Pickwick Club in Boston killed 44 people, most of them party-goers at an event that had started the night before to celebrate the Fourth of July. At 3:30 in the morning, about 120 people were dancing on the second floor of the former Hotel Dreyfus when the ceiling above them fell, followed by a wall and then the floor beneath them.
- Police in Rome reported that the treasury of St. Peter's Basilica was robbed of 5–7 million lira worth of valuables, including gold crosses and other religious objects.
- René Lacoste defeated fellow French tennis player Jean Borotra in the Men's Singles Final at Wimbledon.
- Fighting while in pain from a visit to a dentist earlier in the day, and distracted by an ulcerated tooth, world flyweight boxing champion Pancho Villa (real name Francisco Villaruel) lost a decision to Jimmy McLarnin at Emeryville, California, though the fight was not for the title and Villa retained his championship for the last 10 days of his life. Villa, who earned a record of 90 wins, 8 losses and 4 draws, had three more teeth extracted days later, ignored medical advice to get bed rest, was found to have an infection that spread to his throat and to his heart. He went into a coma after emergency surgery on July 13 and never woke up.

== July 5, 1925 (Sunday) ==
- Spanish toreador Rosario Olmos was badly gored in his right thigh by a bull during a bullfight in Madrid, while American author Ernest Hemingway was present. Hemingway was doing research about bullfighting and the incident would become part of the narrative of the classic 1932 nonfiction book Death in the Afternoon, and would include a news photo of the goring without identifying Olmos.
- Arctic explorers Roald Amundsen, Lincoln Ellsworth, and their four crewmates were given a heroes' welcome at Oslo after returning alive from their attempt to fly an airplane to the North Pole.
- The first performance of the American aerial daredevil team, the 13 Black Cats, was given before several thousand people at the Burdette Airfield in Los Angeles.
- Born:
  - Herbie Seneviratne, Sri Lankan actor and filmmaker; as Richard Herbert Seneviratne, in Kurunegala, British Ceylon (present-day Sri Lanka) (d. 1998)
  - Fernando de Szyszlo, Peruvian painter and sculptor; in Lima, Peru (d. 2017)
  - Jean Raspail, French explorer and novelist; in Chemillé-sur-Dême, Indre-et-Loire département, France (d. 2020)
  - Madeleine Duncan Brown, American advertising executive who claimed to have been the longtime mistress of U.S. President Lyndon B. Johnson and alleged that he was the father of her son; as Madeleine Frances Duncan, in Dallas, United States (d. 2002)
- Died: Hjalmar Borgstrøm, 61, Norwegian composer and music critic (b. 1864)

== July 6, 1925 (Monday) ==
- Numerous arrests were made and stolen items were recovered in the St. Peter's Basilica robbery case. Six workmen who were doing repairs in the vicinity of the treasury room were among those arrested.
- Seven children, ranging in age from 5 to 12 years old, were drowned along with one adult at Pinafore Lake at a park in the Canadian city of St. Thomas, Ontario. The swan boat had been carrying 21 children and four adults when it capsized. The boat went down in water 12 feet (3.7 m) deep and 150 feet (46 m) from shore.
- The city of Mayfield, California came to an end as the incorporated community was absorbed into the neighboring city of Palo Alto by a 1,094 to 441 vote of citizens of both communities.
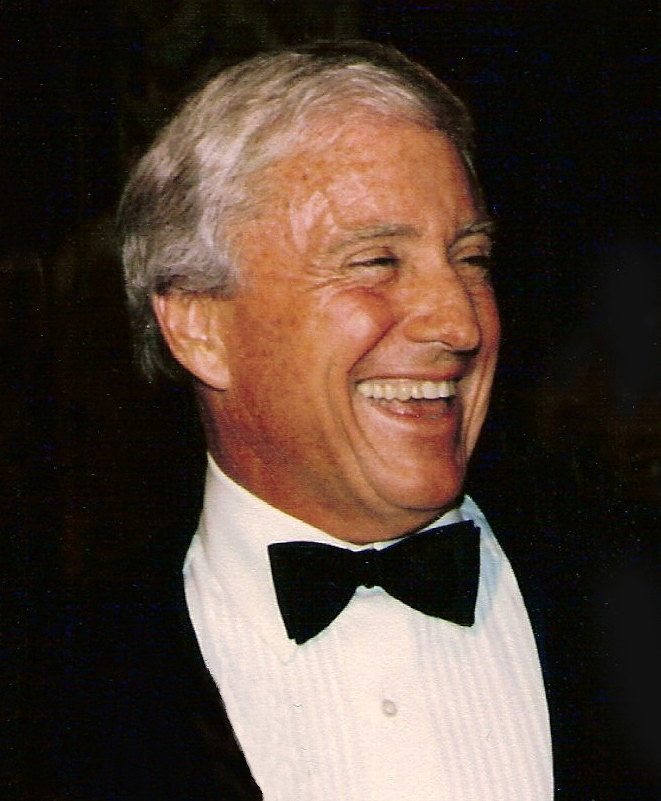
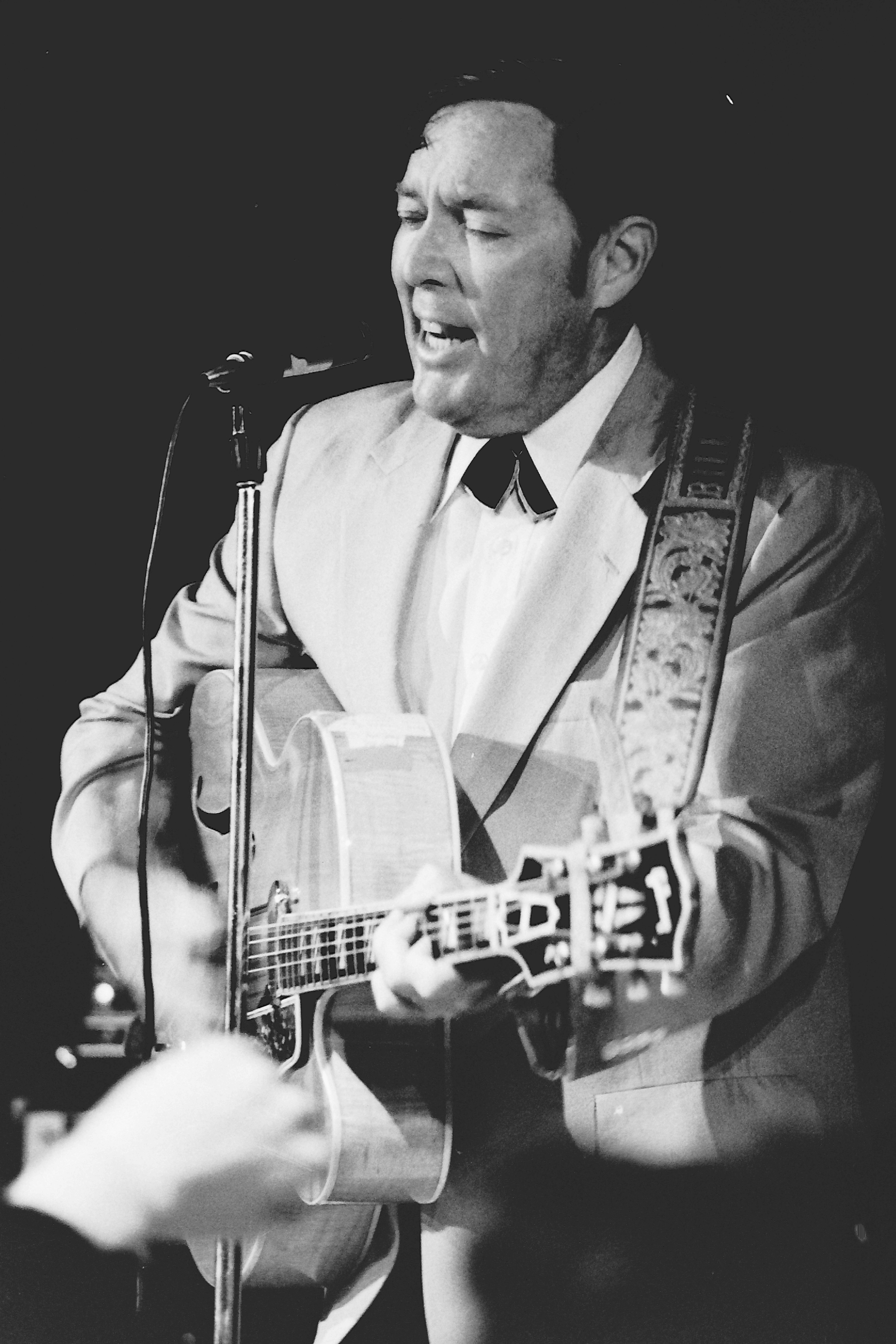
Merv Griffin and Bill Haley
- Born:
  - Merv Griffin, American television personality and media mogul; as Mervyn Griffin Jr., in San Mateo, California, United States (d. 2007)
  - Bill Haley, American rock and roll musician, member of the rock and roll band Bill Haley & His Comets; as William Haley, in Highland Park, Michigan, United States (d. 1981)
  - Ruth Cracknell, Australian comic actress; in Maitland, New South Wales, Australia (d. 2002)
  - Edwin A. Dawes, British biochemist known for his books regarding the history of stage magic; in Goole, West Riding of Yorkshire, England (d. 2023)
  - Kjell Aartun, Norwegian theologian and linguist known for his expertise on Semitic languages and his controversial theories on runic interpretation and on Minoan civilization; in Sjernarøy, Norway (d. 2023)
  - Clarence Scharbauer Jr., American horse breeder, oil company owner and philanthropist, inductee to the Horse Racing Hall of Fame; in Midland, Texas, United States (d. 2014)

== July 7, 1925 (Tuesday) ==
- In the U.S., the Boeing Airplane Company test flew its first passenger aircraft, the Boeing Model 40.
- Loyola College, Chennai, a private Catholic college was founded in India in Madras by the French Jesuit priest, Francis Bertram, along with other European Jesuits, with 75 undergraduates. It would have more than 10,000 students in its 100th year.
- William Jennings Bryan arrived by train in Dayton, Tennessee to a hero's welcome as national anticipation of the Scopes Trial accelerated. Bryan gave a fiery speech saying the trial would be a "duel to the death."
- Died:
  - Helen Carruthers, 32-33, American silent film actress who later become a socialite as the wife of a baron; killed after accidentally falling from the 7th floor of the Ritz Carlton Hotel in New York City (b. 1892)
  - Clarence H. White, 54, American photographer, teacher, and a founding member of the Photo-Secession movement; died from a heart attack while teaching in Mexico City (b. 1871)

== July 8, 1925 (Wednesday) ==
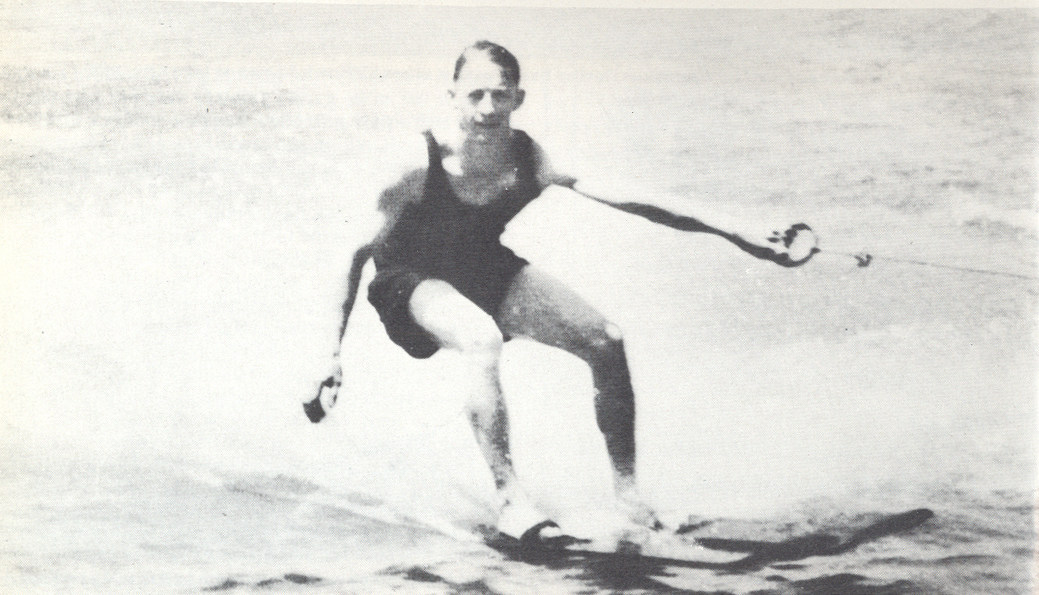
Ralph Samuelson demonstrating his invention, waterskiing

- In the U.S., Ralph Samuelson, later celebrated as "The Father of Waterskiing" became the first person to perform a ski jump on water, performing at a water carnival at Lake Pepin in Minnesota as a speedboat guided him up a ramp with a 30-degree incline and into the air. After his first attempt failed because the ramp was too rough, Samuelson greased the surface with lard and made the first successful jump.
- The Riffians launched a new offensive against the city of Fes in the Rif War.
- Defense lawyer Clarence Darrow arrived in Dayton, Tennessee to much less fanfare than that afforded Bryan the previous day.
- In the ongoing gang war between Al Capone's North Side Gang and the Genna crime family, Tony Genna became the third member of the Genna brothers to be shot to death in less than two months. Angelo Genna had been killed on May 27, followed by Mike Genna's death on June 13 during a gun battle with police.
- Born: Leonard Neff, American psychiatrist, PTSD expert and hostage negotiator; in Peoria, Illinois, United States (d. 2006)

== July 9, 1925 (Thursday) ==
- The Palazzo del Viminale was opened in Rome to serve as the office building of the Prime Minister of Italy, Benito Mussolini.
- The Carillo-Diez de Medina Treaty was signed between Bolivia, by Foreign Minister Eduardo Díez de Medina, and Argentina, represented by Horacio Carrillo, to end a border dispute between the two South American nations. Argentina ceded the city of Yacuiba to Bolivia in accordance with drawing a new border line.
- The French Chamber of Deputies approved an additional 183 million francs to fight the Rif War.
- Born:
  - Guru Dutt, Indian film actor, producer and director; as Vasanth Padukone, in Padukone, Madras Presidency, British India (present-day Karnataka state, India) (d. 1964, drug overdose)
  - Sukhbir, Indian Punjabi novelist and short story writer; as Balbir Singh, in Bombay, British India (present-day Mumbai, India) (d. 2012)
- Died: René Quinton, 58, French pseudoscientist who marketed a "sérum de Quinton", made from seawater, as a substitute for blood in order to treat or prevent illness (b. 1866)

== July 10, 1925 (Friday) ==
- In Quito, Ecuador's president Gonzalo Córdova was arrested and removed from office by the Military League, a group of officers led by Major Carlos Guerrero of the Ecuadorian Army, accompanied by eight officers and 50 soldiers of the Pichinca Battalion.

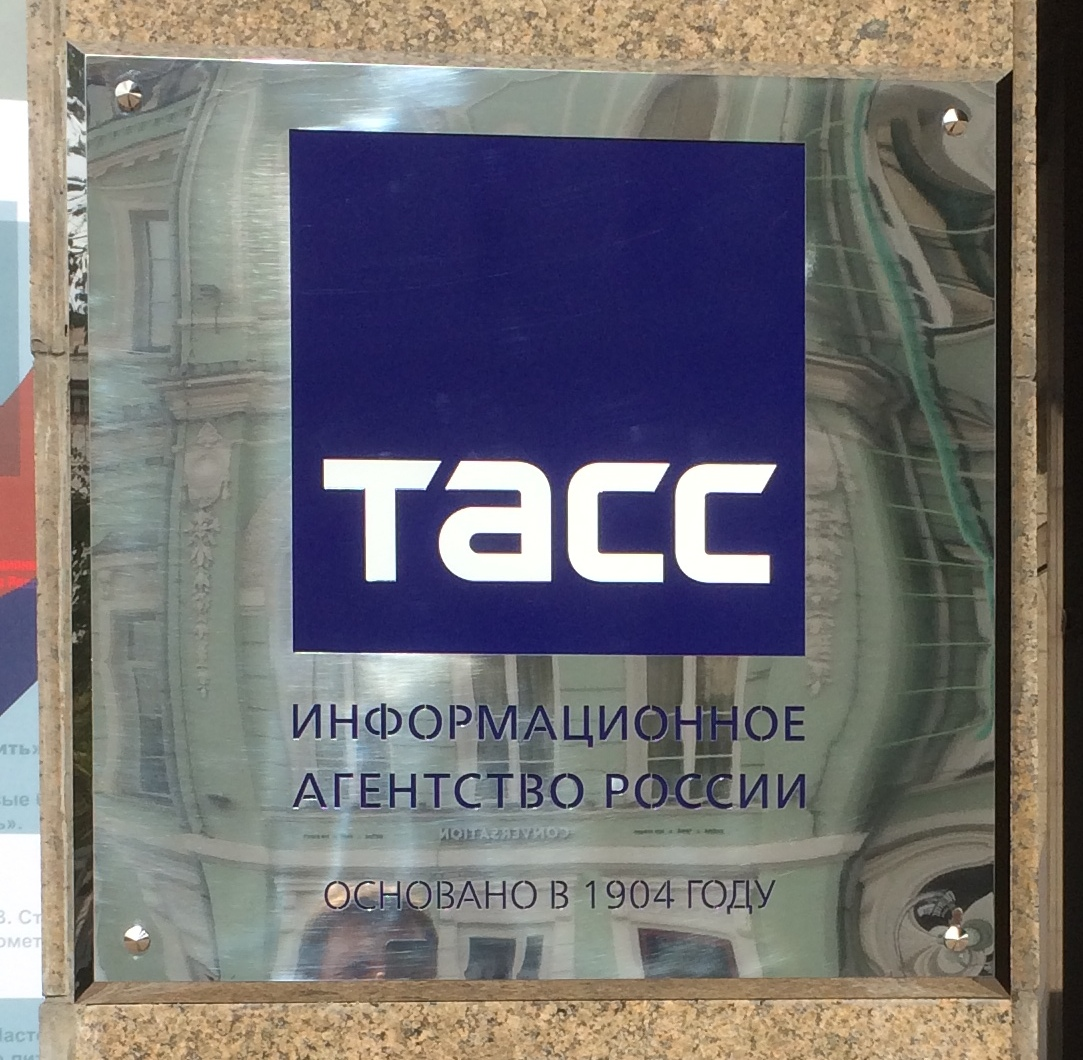
"TASS: Information Agency of Russia"

- TASS, the official news agency for the government of the Soviet Union and now one of the largest news agencies in the world, was established by decree of the Presidium on the Supreme Soviet, taking the duties of ROSTA, the "central information agency" of the Russian SFSR and operating from Moscow. While the name was originally an acronym which stood for Telegrafnoye agentstvo Sovetskogo Soyuza ("Telegraph Agency of the Soviet Union"), it would be renamed Telegrafnoye agentstvo svazi i soobshcheniya ("Telegraph Agency of Communication and Messages") after the fall of Communism.
- In Italian Somaliland, administered as a protectorate by the Fascist government of Italy, Governor Cesare Maria De Vecchi began a campaign to disarm and to take control of the semi-autonomous sultanates, after having been given authorization by Italy's Premier Benito Mussolini.
- The Scopes Monkey Trial began in Dayton, Tennessee with jury selection.
- Born:
  - Mahathir Mohamad, Malaysian politician, served as the Prime Minister of Malaysia 1981 to 2003, and 2018 to 2020; in Alor Setar, Unfederated Malay States (present-day Malaysia) (alive in 2026)
  - Mildred Kornman, American actress, model, and businesswoman, castmember in the Our Gang short films, at the time of her death she was the last surviving actress of the silent film era; in Beverly Hills, California, United States (d. 2022)
  - Dixie Cockerton, New Zealand netball goal keep and national team coach from 1960 to 1963; in Hāwera, New Zealand (d. 1998)

== July 11, 1925 (Saturday) ==
- France and Spain agreed to coordinate their efforts in the Rif War.
- At the age of 17, Phyllis Green of London's Peckham High School for Girls broke the world record for the women's high jump, becoming the first female competitor to jump higher than five feet, clearing the bar at 1.524 meters at an athletics competition held by the Women's Amateur Athletic Association.
- Born:
  - Ted Taylor, American theoretical physicist known for having designed and developed smaller and more efficient fission weapons in the atomic bomb program; as Theodore Taylor, in Mexico City, Mexico (d. 2004)
  - Almaz Monasypov, Russian composer of Tatar symphonic music; in Kazan, Tatar Autonomous Soviet Socialist Republic, Russian SFSR, Soviet Union (present-day Tatarstan, Russia) (d. 2008)
  - Sid Smith, Canadian NHL ice hockey player, winner of the Lady Byng Trophy in 1952 and 1955; as Sidney Smith, in Toronto, Canada (d. 2004)
  - Menhat Helmy, Egyptian artist; in Helwan, Cairo, Kingdom of Egypt (present-day Egypt) (d. 2004)
  - David Graham, English voice actor; in London, England (d. 2024)

== July 12, 1925 (Sunday) ==
- The first radio network in Japan, Nihon Hōsō Kyōkai was created by the agreement the stations Tokyo Hōsō Kyoku and Nagoya Hōsō Kyoku.
- In what is now called the Toledo Incident, a mob of 200 white residents of the logging town of Toledo, Oregon kidnapped 29 residents of Asian descent, forced them into trucks and cars, and transported them to a train station at Oregon. The group— 22 Japanese employees of the Pacific Spruce Corporation sawmill, four Filipino workers and one Korean, along with two wives and three American-born children— were placed on a train bound for Portland. In an unusual outcome to the racist action, the Lincoln County sheriff's department and the Toledo police arrested five of the mob leaders. Eight men and a woman would be sued for violating the civil rights of one of the workers, Tamakichi Ogura, and a year later, judgment would be rendered in Ogura's favor for $2,500 in damages (equivalent to $45,000 a century later).
- The Greek-language Turkish newspaper Apoyevmatini was founded in Istanbul and would continue to be published 100 years later.
- Born:
  - Roger Smith, American automotive executive, Chairman and CEO of General Motors from 1981 to 1990, main subject of Michael Moore's 1989 documentary Roger & Me; in Columbus, Ohio, United States (d. 2007)
  - Rosie Harris, Welsh author of romantic novels; as Marion Rose Young, in Cardiff, Wales (d. 2024)
- Died: H. J. Lawson, 73, British inventor and auto executive, founder of the Daimler Company (b. 1852)

== July 13, 1925 (Monday) ==
- In Turkey, Archbishop Vasileios Georgiadis was elected by his peers as the Ecumenical Patriarch of Constantinople, leader of the Christians of the Eastern Orthodox Church. He took the name Basil III and would serve until his death in 1929.
- One of the oldest ceramic figurines in the world, the Věstonická venuše was discovered by archaeologists in what is now the Czech Republic, at a site near Dolní Věstonice. Dating from the Upper Paleolithic era, the 4.4 inches (11 cm) artifact was estimated to have dated from before at least 24000 B.C. and was possibly as old as 31,000 years.
- The film The Lucky Devil starring Richard Dix was released.
- Walt Disney married Lillian Bounds in Idaho.

== July 14, 1925 (Tuesday) ==
- The United Kingdom and the Kingdom of Siam (now Thailand) signed a general and commercial treaty giving Siam full jurisdictional and fiscal autonomy, with some limitations.
- The Occupation of the Ruhr began to wind down as the first French and Belgian troops evacuated.
- The Tân Việt Revolutionary Party, a non-Communist revolutionary political party advocating independence from France of a "New Vietnam", was founded by Nguyễn Thị Minh Khai.
- Born: Hugh Gillin, American character actor; in Galesburg, Illinois, United States (d. 2004)
- Died: Pancho Villa, 23, Filipino professional boxer and World Flyweight Champion from 1922 to 1925; died of a tooth infection 10 days after losing the title to Jimmy McLarnin (b. 1925)

== July 15, 1925 (Wednesday) ==
- A petition carrying 460,000 signatures was presented in the Reichstag calling for Prohibition (Alkoholverbot) of the sale of alcohol to be enacted in Germany. No law was enacted or voted upon despite the petition.
- Born:
  - Badal Sarkar, Indian dramatist and theatre director; as Sudhindra Sircar, in Calcutta, British India (present-day Kolkata, India) (d. 2011)
  - Philip Carey, American actor, best known for his role as Asa Buchanan on the soap opera One Life to Live from 1980 to 2008; as Eugene Joseph Carey, in Hackensack, New Jersey, United States (d. 2011)
  - Baaron Pittenger, American sports administrator who served as the executive director of the United States Olympic Committee from 1988 to 1990 and USA Hockey from 1990 to 1993; in Kansas City, Missouri, United States (d. 2021)
  - Creed Black, American newspaper publisher and investigative reporter; in Harlan, Kentucky, United States (d. 2011)

== July 16, 1925 (Thursday) ==
- The Canadian province of Saskatchewan repealed the Prohibition Act of 1916. The government resumed control of outlets for the selling and distribution of alcohol.
- U.S. President Calvin Coolidge issued Executive Order 4268, titled "Remission of Further Payments of Installments of the Chinese Indemnity," ending the indemnity payments owed by China following the 1900 Boxer Rebellion.

== July 17, 1925 (Friday) ==
- Almost 80 people were killed in Hong Kong when three days of heavy rains and a landslide caused the collapse of flood wall. The waters swept away or destroyed multiple residences in the Sheung Wan section of the city.
- A joint manifesto calling for the British government to give home rule to India and signed by 40 prominent Indians, was published.
- The Svalbard Act was passed into law by the Parliament of Norway, establishing Norwegian sovereignty and laws over what had formerly been known as the Spitzbergen Islands of the Arctic Ocean.
- Born: Wolfgang Kaiser German experimental physicist known for the development of the ruby laser and his innovations on use of lasers; in Nuremberg, Germany (d. 2023)
- Died: Lovis Corinth, 66, German painter and writer; died of pneumonia (b. 1858)

== July 18, 1925 (Saturday) ==
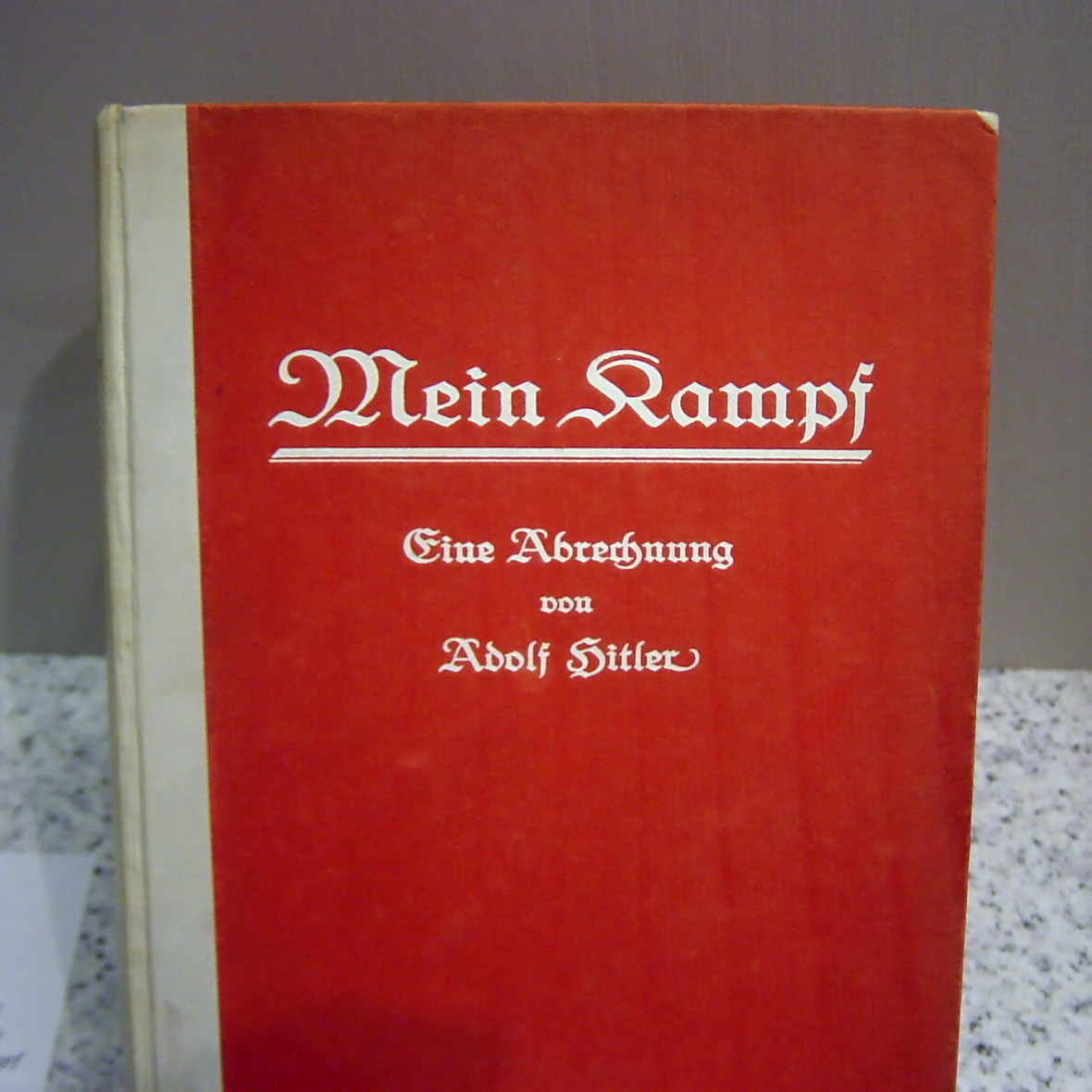
The first edition of Mein Kampf

- Adolf Hitler published Volume 1 of his autobiographical manifesto Mein Kampf.
- Flooding in Seoul, Korea killed hundreds of people as dikes broke on the third straight day of heavy rain.
- Operated by the General Electric Company in the U.S., WGY of Schenectady, New York became the first radio station to be authorized by the Federal Radio Commission to broadcast at 50,000 watts of power on the AM radio band.
- Born: Friedrich Zimmermann, West German politician who served as Federal Minister of the Interior from 1982 to 1989 and as the Federal Minister for Transport from 1989 to 1991; in Munich, Germany (d. 2012)
- Died:
  - Cardinal Louis-Nazaire Bégin, 85, Canadian cardinal of the Catholic Church, served as the Archbishop of Quebec from 1888 until his death (b. 1840)
  - Amos Chapman, 86, Native American civilian scout and interpreter of the Cheyenne language who was awarded the Medal of Honor for his heroism in American Indian Wars (b. 1839). Awarded in 1907, his Medal of Honor was revoked in 1917 due to his civilian status but was posthumously restored to him in 1989.

== July 19, 1925 (Sunday) ==
- Italian cyclist Ottavio Bottecchia won the Tour de France for the second straight year.
- Born:
  - Jack Petchey, British billionaire and philanthropist; in Plaistow, Newham, England (d. 2024)
  - Raja Dinesh Dingh, Indian politician, reigned as Raja of Kalakankar from 1933 until the abolition of princely states in 1947, and served as the Indian Minister of External Affairs from 1969 to 1970 and 1993 to 1995; in Kalakankar, United Provinces of Agra and Oudh, British India (present-day Uttar Pradesh, India) (d. 1995)
  - Pierre Debeaux, French architect; in Mazères-sur-Salat, Haute-Garonne département, France (d. 2001)

== July 20, 1925 (Monday) ==
- Druze rebels captured the French Army garrison at Salkhad and forced officials of the French Mandate of Syria to flee. The Mandate's Governor would retaliate the next day with the arrest of other Druze leaders.
- Italy and Yugoslavia signed the Treaty of Nettuno, permitting Italians to freely emigrate to Dalmatia. Ratification would be held up in the Yugoslav parliament for three years as the Croatian Peasant Party staunchly opposed it. The agreement was a followup to the Treaty of Rome that had been signed on January 27, 1924.
- Near Montecatini Terme in Italy, a gang of Fascists attacked opposition leader Giovanni Amendola, ambushing his car in the dead of night and beating him savagely. Details of the attack were censored in government-controlled media to avoid another outcry along the lines of the Matteotti scandal. Amendola, who had founded the Unione Nazionale Party after the 1924 murder of Giacomo Matteotti died of his injuries nine months later.
- Boise City, Oklahoma, was incorporated after 17 years as the unincorporated seat of Cimarron County, Oklahoma.
- Born:
  - Jacques Delors, French economist; in Paris, France (d. 2023)
  - Frantz Fanon, Martinican psychiatrist and philosopher; in Fort-de-France, Martinique (d. 1961)
  - Joan Long, Australian film producer and screenwriter best known for Caddie (1976); as Joan Boundy, in Rushworth, Victoria, Australia (d. 1999)

== July 21, 1925 (Tuesday) ==
- The Scopes Trial ended with John Scopes being found guilty of violating the Butler Act and fined $100, which both William Jennings Bryan and the American Civil Liberties Union offered to pay for him. After the verdict was read Scopes made his only statement during the trial, vowing to "oppose this law in any way I can. Any other action would be in violation of my ideal of academic freedom — that is, to teach the truth as guaranteed in our constitution, of personal and religious freedom."
- The Great Syrian Revolt against the French occupation of the Mandate of Syria was started as General Maurice Sarrail, the High Commissioner of the Levant, ordered the arrest of nine delegates and their deportation to Palmyra, including three who had come to his office on June 6 to present requests for appointment of a Druze governor for the Jabal Druze State. In response to the arrest, Sultan al-Atrash called for an Arab uprising.
- Malcolm Campbell became the first person to drive at a speed of more than 150 miles per hour, averaging 150.87 miles per hour (242.80 km/h) at the Welsh village of Pendine.
- The Soviet Council of People's Commissars passed a resolution mandating use of the metric system throughout the Soviet Union. Among the units of measure to be phased out were the arshin (71.12 centimetres (2 ft 4.00 in), the milya (7.4676 kilometres (4.6402 mi)), the zolotnik (4.2658 grams (0.15047 oz) and the pood (16.37 kilograms (36.1 lb)).

== July 22, 1925 (Wednesday) ==
- The Battle of al-Kafr began in the Great Syrian Revolt, as Druze revolutionaries shot down a French military aircraft and ambushed a column of French soldiers, killing 111 out of 174 members.
- The Ethel Smyth comic opera Entente Cordiale was first performed at the Royal College of Music in London. The performance was broadcast on the BBC.
- The Ben Travers comedy farce A Cuckoo in the Nest premiered its first of 376 performances at the Aldwych Theatre in London.
- Born:
  - Paul Henson, American telecommunications executive who built the Sprint Corporation from a small telephone company into the largest provider of fiber optic network service; in Lincoln, Nebraska, United States (d. 1997)
  - La Dama Enmascarada, Mexican luchadora and women's wrestling champion; as Magdalena Caballero, in Mexico City, Mexico (d. 2006)
- Died: Albert Jaegers, 57, German-born American sculptor; died from heart disease (b. 1868)

== July 23, 1925 (Thursday) ==
- The Miners' Federation of Great Britain called for a miners' strike starting on July 31.
- Born:
  - Tajuddin Ahmad, Bangladeshi politician who served as the first Prime Minister of Bangladesh from 1971 to 1972; as Tajuddin Ahmad Khan, in Dardaria, Bengal Presidency, British India (present-day Kapasia Upazila, Bangladesh) (d. 1975, assassinated)
  - Quett Masire, Motswana politician and statesman, served as the President of Botswana from 1980 to 1998; as Ketumile Quett Joni Masire, in Kanye, Bechuanaland Protectorate (present-day Botswana) (d. 2017)
  - Gloria DeHaven, American actress and singer; in Los Angeles, United States (d. 2016)
- Died:
  - Alberto Valenzuela Llanos, 55, Chilean painter (b. 1869)
  - Subramaniya Siva, 40, Indian independence activist and advocate for the Tamil people; died from leprosy (b. 1884)

== July 24, 1925 (Friday) ==
- Britain enacted the first Palestinian Citizenship Order 1925, officially outlining the legal definition of a Palestinian for the first time. The order applied citizenship to "Turkish subjects habitually resident in the territory of Palestine upon the 1st day of August, 1925", and did not apply to residents of the mandate for Transjordan. It would remain in effect until the end of the British mandate on May 14, 1948.
- In the U.S., 8-year-old Arthur "Buddy" Schumacher was kidnapped and murdered after he and three of his friends were chased by a man while in the woods near Wauwatosa, Wisconsin. His body was discovered on September 12. Although two different suspects were questioned, the case was never solved.
- Born:
  - Adele Addison, African American soprano opera singer; in New York City, United States (alive in 2026)
  - Miiko Taka, American of Japanese ancestry, best known for co-starring with Marlon Brando in Sayonara (1957); as Miiko Shikata, in Seattle, Washington, United States (d. 2023)
  - Ignacio Aldecoa, Spanish novelist; as José Ignacio Aldecoa e Isasi, in Vitoria-Gasteiz, Spain (d. 1969)
  - Jacques Derogy, French investigative journalist; as Jacques Weitzmann, in Neuilly-sur-Seine, Hauts-de-Seine, France (d. 1997)
- Died: Dan Broström, 55, Swedish shipping magnate and politician, served as Sweden's Minister of Naval Affairs from 1914 to 1917; killed in a car accident at Trönninge near Halmstad.

== July 25, 1925 (Saturday) ==
- A report was filed by the Temporary Slavery Commission of the League of Nations, a temporary investigative committee created to review progress toward abolition in world nations and their colonies where slavery had been legal. Their report on the global investigation of slavery and slave trade prepared the ground for the introduction of the 1926 Slavery Convention. At the time, slavery and slave trading was still legal in Islamic nations on the Arabian Peninsula, including Saudi Arabia. In Africa, it was prevalent in the Anglo-Egyptian Sudan, Ethiopia, the Spanish Sahara, and Bechuanaland (now Botswana), and Liberia. Slavery was also permitted in parts of the Republic of China.
- Died: Harriet McClintock Marshall, 84, African American conductor on the Underground Railroad whose house in Harrisburg, Pennsylvania operated as a safe house for escaped Southern slaves (b. 1840)

== July 26, 1925 (Sunday) ==
- In the Soviet Union, Grigory Grachov, angry at his neighbors in the village of Ivankovo, set a fire and then shot and killed 11 people and wounded eight others, then burned down all but one of the houses in the village.
- The French team of Robert Benoist and Albert Divo won the 1925 French Grand Prix, though the race was marred by the death of Antonio Ascari. The Italian racer was leading after 23 laps when he swerved into wooden fencing on the edge of the track and his car to overturned. He bled to death while being taken in an ambulance to the nearest hospital.
- Only five days after obtaining a guilty verdict against the defendant in the Scopes Trial, William Jennings Bryan died in his sleep from an apparent stroke. Bryan had been the Democratic Party nominee in the 1896, 1900 and 1908 U.S. presidential elections, losing all three.
- Peruvian archaeologist Julio Cesar Tello discovered the ruins of the city of Atahualpa during excavations.
- Born:
  - Joseph Engelberger, American physicist, engineer and entrepreneur known for developing the Unimate, the first industrial robot in the U.S.; in Brooklyn, New York City, United States (d. 2015)
  - John Foreman, American film producer known for producing Butch Cassidy and the Sundance Kid (1969) and Prizzi's Honor (1985); in Idaho Falls, Idaho, United States (d. 1992)
  - Gene Gutowski, Polish-born American film producer; as Witold Bardach, in Lwow, Poland (present-day Lviv, Ukraine) (d. 2016)
  - Ana María Matute, Spanish writer and Cervantes Prize winner; in Barcelona, Spain (d. 2014)
  - Tyeb Mehta, Indian sculptor, painter, and filmmaker; in Kapadvanj, Presidency of Bombay and Sind, British India (present-day Gujarat, India) (d. 2009)
  - Matija Vuković, Serbian sculptor; in Platičevo, Kingdom of Yugoslavia (present-day Serbia) (d. 1985)
  - Richard Beyer, American sculptor; in Washington, D.C., United States (d. 2012)
- Died:
  - Gottlob Frege, 76, German mathematician and philosopher (b. 1848)
  - William Jennings Bryan, 65, American lawyer and politician, served as the US Secretary of State from 1913 to 1915 (b. 1860)

== July 27, 1925 (Monday) ==
- The Houdina Radio Control Company, owned by Francis P. Houdina, gave the first demonstration of a remote controlled automobile. Houdina equipped the driverless American Wonder, a 1926 Chandler car, with a radio antenna and a receiver and, with transmission from another car immediately behind the wonder, guided the Wonder in New York City up Broadway Street and, after a turn, back down Fifth Avenue. The car narrowly missed several other vehicles before crashing into a sedan.
- The first radio station in the Australian state of Queensland, 4QG Brisbane, commenced operation as a service of the Queensland state government.
- George Seldes, an American correspondent for the Chicago Tribune, was ordered to leave Italy for refusing to alter the tone of his dispatches which displeased the Fascist government of premier Benito Mussolini government.

== July 28, 1925 (Tuesday) ==
- In British India, the Sikh Gurdwaras Act, 1925 was signed into law by the Viceroy Rufus Isaacs, Earl of Reading, after being ratified by the Legislative Council of the Punjab Province, to take effect on November 1. The act brought control and protection of the gurdwaras— places of worship for the adherents of Sikhism — to the Shiromani Gurdwara Parbandhak Committee, consisting of the five Sikh members of the Council, and provided for an attestation for persons who identified as Sikhs, defined as a belief in the Guru Granth Sahib and the Ten Gurus.
- Wilhelm II, the last Kaiser of Germany, issued a statement to the United Press agency that he believed the Treaty of Versailles should be scrapped. The former monarch, who had been stripped of his powers in 1918, said through his spokesman Hubert von Rebeur-Paschwitz, "The criminal and impossible treaty of Versailles has disarmed Germany and left Europe and the world bereft of the greatest factor of peace."
- Born:
  - Baruch S. Blumberg, American scientist and recipient of the Nobel Prize in Physiology or Medicine, known for his work on developing a test for diagnosing hepatitis B; in Brooklyn, New York City, United States (d. 2011)
  - Juan Alberto Schiaffino, Uruguayan footballer who played for the Uruguay national football team and won 1950 FIFA World Cup, later played for the Italy national football team in 1954 and 1958; in Montevideo, Uruguay (d. 2002)
  - Lidija Doroņina-Lasmane, Latvian dissident and anti-Soviet resistance member imprisoned during the Soviet occupation of Latvia; as Lidija Lasmane, in Ulmale, Latvia (living in 2026)
  - John Stonehouse, British politician and Privy Council member, served as the Minister of Posts and Telecommunications, known for disappearing in 1974 to fake his own death; in Southampton, England (d. 1988)
- Died: Edgar Bancroft, 67, American lawyer and diplomat, served as the U.S. Ambassador to Japan from November 1924 until his death (b. 1857)

== July 29, 1925 (Wednesday) ==
- Werner Heisenberg's groundbreaking paper on the matrix mechanics formulation of quantum mechanics, "Über quantentheoretische Umdeutung kinematischer und mechanischer Beziehungen" ("On quantum theoretical reinterpretation of kinematic and mechanical relationships") was received by the German scientific journal Zeitschrift für Physik and would be published in its September issue.
- O Globo (The Globe), the highest circulation newspaper in Brazil, began publication in Rio de Janeiro after being founded by Irineu Marinho, owner of the evening paper A Noite.
- The Vatican newspaper L'Osservatore Romano printed a long list of Fascist offenses against Catholics.
- A new law was announced in a semi-official Italian publication stating that any newspaper publishing attacks on the government that were "too strong and too frequent" would receive two warnings, after which the paper would no longer be recognized.
- Born:
  - Ted Lindsay, Canadian professional hockey player in the NHL and Hockey Hall of Fame inductee; as Robert Blake Theodore Lindsay, in Renfrew, Ontario, Canada (d. 2019)
  - Shivram Dattatreya Phadnis, Indian cartoonist and illustrator; in Bhoj, Bombay Presidency, British India (present-day Karnataka, India) (alive in 2026)
  - Mikis Theodorakis, Greek composer and lyricist; as Michail Theodorakis, in Chios, Greece (d. 2021)
- Died: Mark Fenton, 58, American stage and film actor; died following his injuries in an automobile accident (b. 1866)

== July 30, 1925 (Thursday) ==
- The Albanian Republic ceded parts of its territory to neighboring Yugoslavia (at the time, "The Kingdom of Serbs, Croats and Slovenes"), including the village of Džepište and the Monastery of Saint Naum as part of repayment for the Yugoslavian help in defending Albania against claims by Italy.
- Negotiations between the British government and representatives of the country's nearly one million coal miners entered their final hours before a nationwide miner's strike over wages was set to begin at midnight. Leaders of the railway and transport workers issued notices to their workers telling them not to handle coal when the strike began as a gesture of solidarity with the miners. British Prime Minister Stanley Baldwin told the press, "All the workers in this country have got to take reductions in wages to help put industry on its feet."
- Born:
  - Peter Pauson, German-born British chemist noted for the Pauson–Khand reaction and for the synthesis of the organometallic compound ferrocene; in Bamberg, Germany (d. 2013)
  - Alexander Trocchi, Scottish novelist; in Glasgow, Scotland (d. 1984)
- Died: William Wynn Westcott, 76, British Freemason and Supreme Magus of the Societas Rosicruciana in Anglia from 1891 until his death (b. 1848)

== July 31, 1925 (Friday) ==
- In what would become known in Britain as "Red Friday" as a positive opposite to a previous "Black Friday", the government of Prime Minister Stanley Baldwin averted a coal miners' strike by agreeing to provide a subsidy to maintain the miners' wages until a commission could study the situation.
- With the Giacomo Matteotti murder trial still pending, the Italian government issued a decree granting amnesty for those arraigned on charges of "premeditated political murder" in the event that it could not be proven whether the murder was premeditated or had happened under "unforeseen circumstances".
- Born: Carmel Quinn, Irish singer and performer; in Dublin, Irish Free State (present-day Republic of Ireland) (d. 2021)
