= June 1925 =

Month of 1925

°

<<	June 1925					>>
Su	Mo	Tu	We	Th	Fr	Sa
	1	2	3	4	5	6
7	8	9	10	11	12	13
14	15	16	17	18	19	20
21	22	23	24	25	26	27
28	29	30

The following events occurred in June 1925:

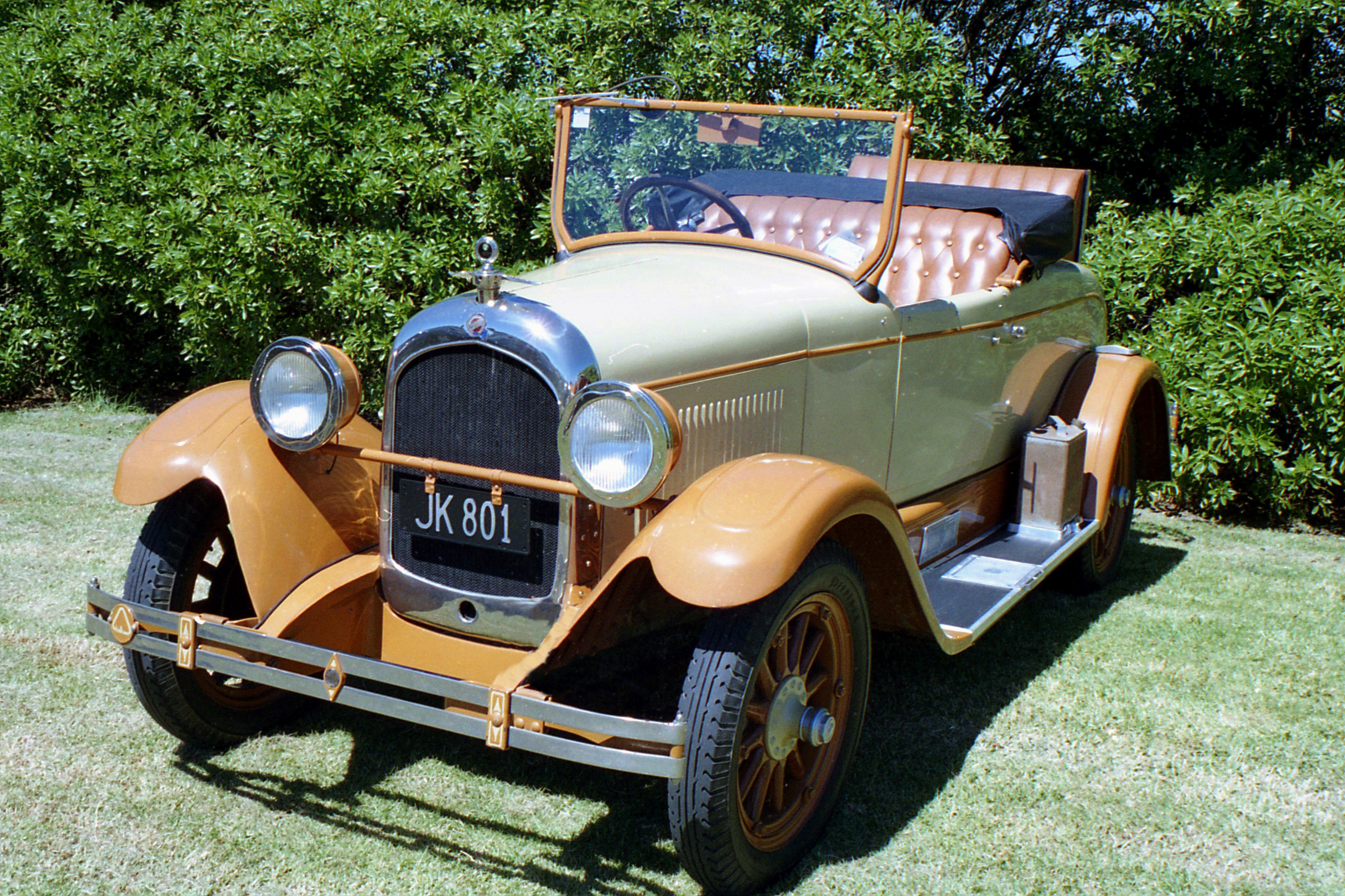
June 6, 1925: The Chrysler Motor Company is incorporated in the U.S. (pictured, the 1925 Chrysler Roadster)

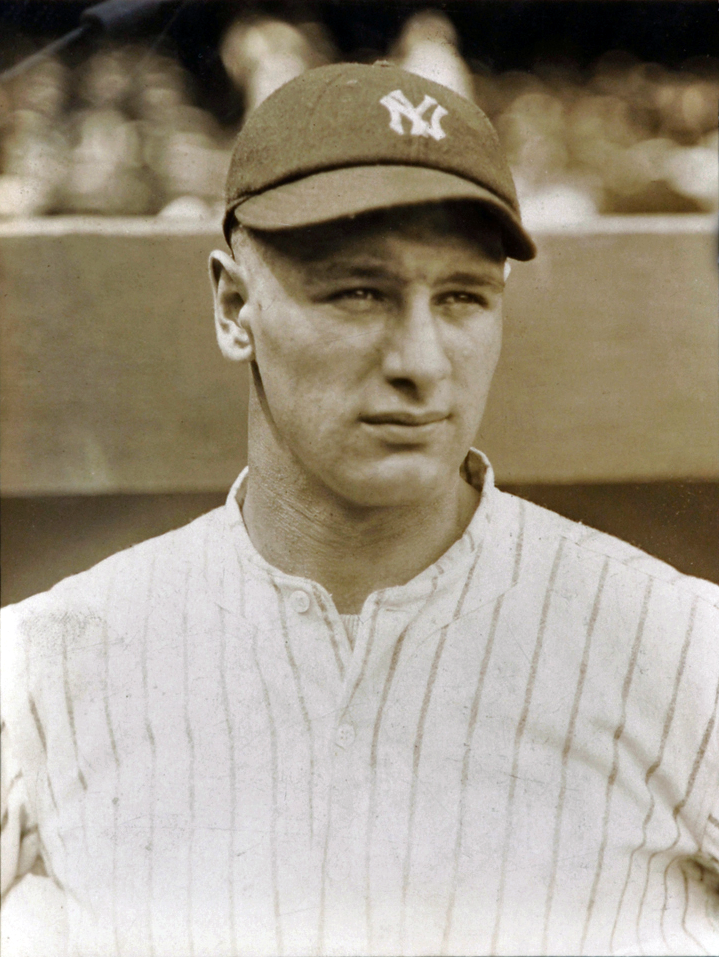
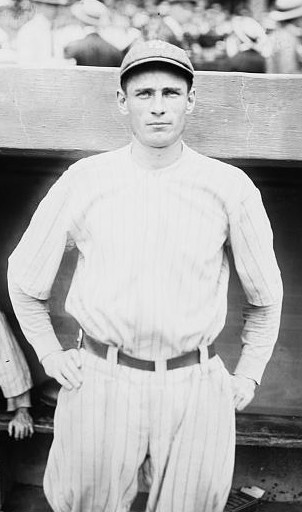
June 2, 1925: Lou Gehrig gets opportunity for stardom when Wally Pipp gets a headache.

== June 1, 1925 (Monday) ==
- The U.S. Supreme Court rendered its landmark decision in Pierce v. Society of Sisters, expanding the Due Process Clause of the Fourteenth Amendment to the United States Constitution to apply to personal civil liberties within U.S. states. The unanimous holding struck down the 1922 Oregon Compulsory Education Act, which required all school-age children in the state to attend public school.
- The Tangier International Zone was formally established in the Kingdom of Morocco, at the time a protectorate of France.
- Babe Ruth returned to the New York Yankees for his first game of the season after a long illness. He went 0-for-2 with a walk as the visiting Washington Senators won 5–3. Lou Gehrig's consecutive games-played record streak began in the same game, as the Yankees' Gehrig was sent in as a pinch-hitter for Pee-Wee Wanninger for the first of 2,130 games in a row.
- Canada's Minister of the Interior, Charles Stewart, announced to the House of Commons that Canada claimed all land between Alaska and Greenland up to the North Pole, with the exception of Wrangel Island.
- An intense and deadly heat wave began in parts of the United States.
- American hotel owner Raymond Orteig revived the Orteig Prize of $25,000— equivalent to $451,000 in 2025— to be awarded to the first aviator, or aviators, who could fly non-stop by airplane between New York City and Paris. The five-year term of the original prize had expired on May 22, 1924. Orteig deposited $25,000 in negotiable securities at the Bryant Bank, to be controlled by a seven-member board of trustees and available to anyone who could make the crossing by May 31, 1930.
- Union City, New Jersey, was created in the U.S. by the merger of Union Hill and West Hoboken Township.
- Workers' newspaper Davar began publication in Mandatory Palestine.
- Born: Dilia Díaz Cisneros, Venezuelan teacher and poet; in El Hatillo, Venezuela (d. 2017)
- Died:
  - Thomas R. Marshall, 71, American lawyer and politician, served as Vice President of the United States from 1913 to 1921; died from a heart attack (b. 1854)
  - Lucien Guitry, 64, French stage actor (b. 1860)

== June 2, 1925 (Tuesday) ==
- Elections were held for the 92-member Philippine House of Representatives and for 11 members of the 24-member Philippine Senate. While the Nacionalista Party had been split into two factions before reuniting, and the party lost Senate seats to the Democrata Party, the Nacionalistas retained a 12 to 10 majority in the Senate and had a 64-22 majority in the House.
- The New York Yankees' starting first baseman, Wally Pipp arrived at a game with a severe headache, and after asking for two aspirins, was replaced by the relatively unknown Lou Gehrig, who played so well that he permanently took Pipp's position and went on to a Hall of Fame career. Pipp would later be quoted to have said, "I took the two most expensive aspirin in history."
- Eddie Collins of the Chicago White Sox became only the sixth player in major league baseball history to get 3,000 hits in his career, doing so on a pitch from Warren "Rip" Collins (no relation) of the Detroit Tigers, in a 12 to 7 Chicago win. During the historic hit, the Tigers had Ty Cobb, who had gotten his 3,000th hit in 1921, playing centerfield.
- Born:
  - Melvin J. Glimcher, American biomedical engineer known for developing the Boston Arm, the electronically-operated artificial limb; in Brookline, Massachusetts, United States (d. 2014)
  - Michael P. W. Stone, British-American business executive and federal government administrator, served as the U.S. Secretary of the Army from 1989 to 1993; in London (d.1995)
- Died:
  - John Kennedy Tod, 72, Scottish-born American banker and railway executive, and was a rugby union player for the Scottish national team (b. 1852)
  - James Ellsworth, 75, American mine owner and banker (b. 1849)

== June 3, 1925 (Wednesday) ==
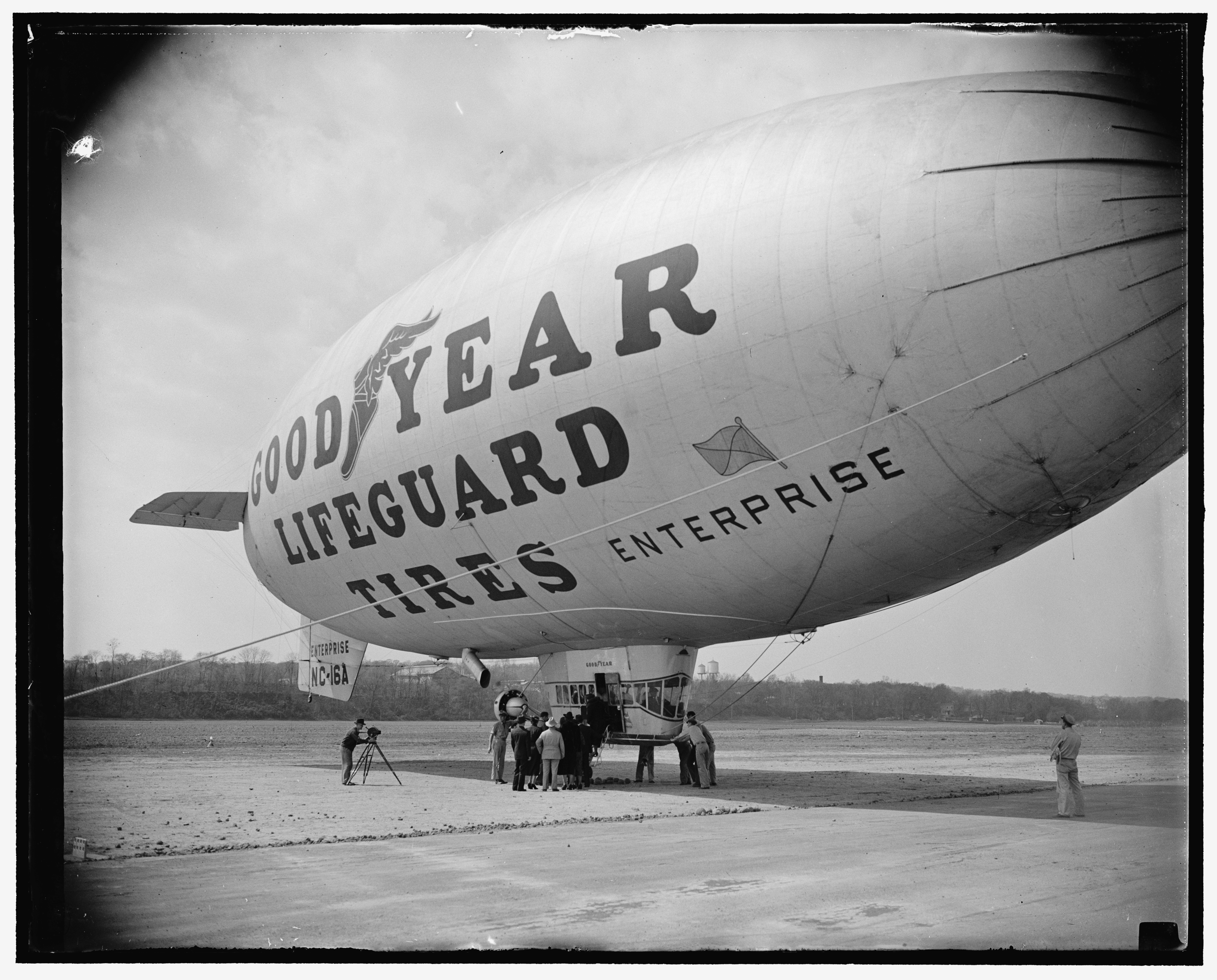
An early version of Goodyear's advertising airship in 1938

- The Goodyear Tire and Rubber Company of Akron, Ohio, launched its first "Goodyear Blimp", a non-rigid airship dubbed "the Pilgrim", beginning one of the most well-known advertising and public relations campaigns in history.
- Turkey's Progressive Republican Party (Terakkiperver Cumhuriyet Fırkası), led by Kâzım Karabekir, was ordered closed by an Independence Tribunal on grounds that the party had supported the protection of Islamic religious customs that had caused the recently suppressed Sheikh Said rebellion. Karabekir and other 82 other members of the Terakkiperver were arrested two days later on June 5. Sarrail had the nine delegates arrested on July 21 and the Sultan al-Atrash called for the Arab uprising.
- Born:
  - Tony Curtis American film actor known for Some Like It Hot, The Defiant Ones and The Great Impostor; as Bernard Schwartz, in New York City, United States (d. 2010)
  - Air Marshal David Evans, Chief of Staff of the Royal Australian Air Force from 1982 to 1985; as Selwyn David Evans, in Paddington, New South Wales, Australia (d. 2020)
  - Gertrude Michelson, American business executive and the first woman to serve on the Board of Directors of multiple Fortune 500 corporations; as Gertrude Geraldine Rosen, in Jamestown, New York, United States (d. 2015)
  - Died: Lue Gim Gong, 67, Chinese-born American farmer known for revolutionizing the citrus fruit industry in Florida with his cross-breeding and pollination techniques on improving oranges, grapefruits, apples and tomatoes (b. 1857)

== June 4, 1925 (Thursday) ==
- Floyd Russel, 43, shot to death eight members of his family in a mass shooting in Hamilton, Ohio, then attempted suicide by shooting himself in the chest. He waited until the family was asleep and killed his mother, his brother, and the brother's wife and five of six children. Russel told police that he was afraid that the family would be evicted and believed that there was a past-due mortgage on the family home.
- Banco Venezolano de Crédito, the oldest private bank in Venezuela, was established in Caracas by bankers Henrique Pérez Dupuy, Santiago Alfonso Rivas, Félix Guerrero, Juan Santos González and Alejandro Lara and introduced credit to the South American nation's commerce."
- Born:
  - Odette Ferreira, Portuguese microbiologist known for her identification of the HIV-2 virus and for coordinating the Portuguese health campaign to end AIDS; as Maria Odette Santos Ferreira, in Lisbon, Portugal (d. 2018)
  - György Harag, Romanian actor and director; in Marghita, Kingdom of Romania (present-day Romania) (d. 1985)
- Died: John Addison Fordyce, 67, American dermatologist and professor, known for his identification of the Fordyce's spot and for Fox–Fordyce disease (b. 1858)

== June 5, 1925 (Friday) ==
- In Germany, the Rentenmark, which had been issued in 1923 in an attempt to control the problem of hyperinflation in the Weimar Republic, became obsolete as the deadline for exchanging the currency for the new Reichsmark was reached.
- In British India, Jiwajirao Scindia became the last Maharaja of the princely state of Gwalior upon the death of his father, the Maharaja Madho Rao Scindia. Knighted in British India as Sir George Jiwajirao Scindia, he ruled until May 28, 1948, when the Gwalior State was absorbed into what is now the Indian state of Madhya Pradesh.
- Scottish pro Willie Macfarlane won the U.S. Open golf tournament.
- Aristotle University of Thessaloniki was founded.
- Born:
  - Jephsis Hitler, Indian comedian, playwright and stage actor; as José Francisco Leitaõ, in Chinchinim, Goa, Portuguese India (present-day India) (d. 1997)
  - Maharani Wisma Susana Siregar, British-born Indonesian wife of President Sukarno who served as the First Lady of Indonesia from 1958 to 1962; in Liverpool, England
- Died: Jenny Apolant, 50, German Jewish feminist and politician; died from heart disease (b. 1874)

== June 6, 1925 (Saturday) ==
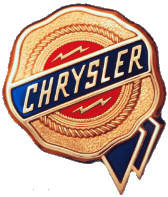
The original Chrylser logo

- The U.S. automaker Chrysler Corporation was incorporated by Walter P. Chrysler, who had acquired the assets of the defunct Maxwell Motor Company.
- The Great Syrian Revolt against the French occupation of the Mandate of Syria was triggered when representatives of the Jabal Druze State were treated poorly by the French administrator. The Druze delegation arrived in Beirut in the French Mandate of Lebanon to present their request to General Maurice Sarrail, the High Commissioner of the Levant. Rather than listening to a request that a Druze governor be appointed to replace the French Governor Carbillet, General Sarrail ordered the delegation to leave Beirut or to be arrested and exiled to the Syrian city of Palmyra.
- Norway sent out two planes and two steamships to search for the North Pole seaplane expedition of Roald Amundsen which had been missing for over two weeks.
- Sergei Prokofiev's Symphony No. 2 in D minor was performed for the first time, premiering in Paris as part of the Concdrts Koussevitzky conducted by Serge Koussevitzky.
- Born: Michael ffolkes, British illustrator and cartoonist; as Brian Davis, in London, England (d. 1988)

== June 7, 1925 (Sunday) ==
- At the Waldstadion in Frankfurt, 1. FC Nürnberg defeated FSV Frankfurt, 1 to 0 after extra time, to win the Viktoria Trophy, the championship of German fußball at the end of a 16-team playoff that had started on May 3.
- The Beaumont-Hamel Newfoundland Memorial was unveiled in France on grounds where the Battle of the Somme was fought in July 1916, commemorating the Dominion of Newfoundland forces who were killed in the Great War.
- Nine people are killed in a familicide at the Bavaria-Thuringia border in Germany.
- Born:
  - John Biddle, American yachting cinematographer; in Philadelphia, United States (d. 2008)
  - Alan R. Pearlman, American engineer and founder of ARP Instruments, manufacturer of musical synthesizers; in New York City, United States (d. 2019)
- Died: Fredrik Rosing Bull, 42, Norwegian information technology scientist known for his improvement of the technology for punched card data reading; died of cancer (b. 1882)

== June 8, 1925 (Monday) ==
- The U.S. Supreme Court issued its decision in the landmark case of Gitlow v. New York, holding that the 14th Amendment to the U.S. Constitution extended the First Amendment protections of freedom and speech and freedom of the press to individual state governments. Specifically, the Court upheld a New York law that made it a crime to advocate the overthrow of a government by force.
- An explosion in a coal mine in Sturgis, Kentucky killed 17 people.
- The Noël Coward comic play Hay Fever opened at the Ambassadors Theatre in the City of Westminster, England.
- Born:
  - Barbara Bush, First Lady of the United States from 1989 to 1993, wife of President George H. W. Bush and mother of President George W. Bush; as Barbara Pierce, in New York City, United States (d. 2018)
  - Del Ennis, American professional baseball player, 1950 National League leader with 126 runs batted in for the Philadelphia Phillies; as Delmer Ennis, in Philadelphia, United States (d. 1996)
  - Eddie Gaedel, American variety artist known for being the shortest player in a Major League Baseball game; in Chicago, United States (d. 1961)

== June 9, 1925 (Tuesday) ==
- The United States heat wave eased after an estimated 500 deaths nationwide.
- Ten people were killed and 48 injured in Australia at Traveston, Queensland, when a train derailed and plunged off of a trestle bridge.
- Born: V. J. P. Saldanha, Indian novelist and short-story writer; as Vincent John Peter Saldanha, in Mangalore, Bombay Presidency, British India (present-day Karnataka, India) (d. 2000)

== June 10, 1925 (Wednesday) ==
- The United Church of Canada was created by the merger of the Methodist Church, Canada and the Congregational Union of Ontario and Quebec, as well as most of the congregations of the Presbyterian Church in Canada, and the Association of Local Union Churches, to create the largest Protestant denomination in Canada. The merger took place in a meeting of leaders and representatives of the churches at the Mutual Street Arena in Toronto.
- Worn-out brake linings and excessive oil on brake drums contributed to the deaths of seven people in the derailment of a train in England as it went out of control down a steep hill near Hebden, North Yorkshire. A witness reported that the driver commented that "the brake has been burnt out" before hitting it three times with a hammer and declaring "it's all right now."
- Born:
  - Fortunato Abat, Filipino major general who served as the Commander of the Philippine Army from 1976 to 1981, and as the National Defense Secretary of the Philippines from 1997 to 1998; in San Juan, La Union, Philippine Islands (present-day Philippines) (d. 2018)
  - Diana Maggi, Italian-born Argentine actress; as Graziosa Maggi, in Milan, Kingdom of Italy (present-day Italy) (d. 2022)
  - James Salter, American novelist and short story writer known for The Hunters; as James Arnold Horowitz, in Passaic, New Jersey, United States (d. 2015)

== June 11, 1925 (Thursday) ==
- In a treaty with the Empire of Japan, the Republic of China agreed to help Japanese soldiers in removing Korean immigrants from China's northeastern provinces, which had become a haven for Korean independence agitators.
- In Canada, rioting by coal miners took place in New Waterford, Nova Scotia, after some of the security guards of British Empire Steel and Coal Company (BESCO) got drunk and rode on horseback through town, knocking down any bystanders, including several schoolchildren. A crowd of 3,000 United Mine Workers members and their families walked to the Waterford Lake power plant and confronted a group of 100 BESCO guards and police and attacked them. The guards then fired into the crowd and killed one miner, William Davis as well as wounding others. June 11 is now William Davis Miners' Memorial Day in Nova Scotia, recognizing all miners killed on the job in the province.
- Born:
  - William Styron, American novelist known for The Confessions of Nat Turner (1967) and Sophie's Choice (1979); in Newport News, Virginia, United States (d. 2006)
  - Felisa Vanoff, American dancer, choreographer, and philanthropist; as Phyllis Caputo, in Ambridge, Pennsylvania, United States (d. 2014)
- Died: William Davis, 38, Anglo-Canadian miner; killed by a police officer in the New Waterford coal miner riots (b. 1887)

== June 12, 1925 (Friday) ==
- UCLA, the University of California, Los Angeles, still referred to at the time as the "Southern Branch of the University of California", awarded its first Bachelor of Arts degrees to 128 graduates, 98 of whom were women.
- After Mexico's President Plutarco Calles threatened to have the government seize possession of the oil fields owned by U.S. and European companies, U.S. Secretary of State Frank B. Kellogg threatened to break relations.
- French Prime Minister Paul Painlevé flew to Morocco to assess the front line situation in the Rif War.
- The Roman Catholic Church granted leave for Dr. Anna Maria Dengel to form what would become the Medical Mission Sisters.
- Born: Dick Miles, American table tennis player and 10-time U.S. national champion between 1945 and 1962, described in his obituary as "perhaps the greatest table tennis player the United States has ever produced"; as Richard Miles, in Manhattan, New York City, United States (d. 2010)
- Died:
  - Warren S. Stone, 65, American union leader, served as president of the Brotherhood of Locomotive Engineers from 1903 until his death; died from kidney disease (b. 1860)
  - Gustave Garcia, 88, Italian baritone opera singer (b. 1837)
  - Calvin Demarest, 39, American amateur billiards champion; died in an insane asylum (b. 1886)

== June 13, 1925 (Saturday) ==
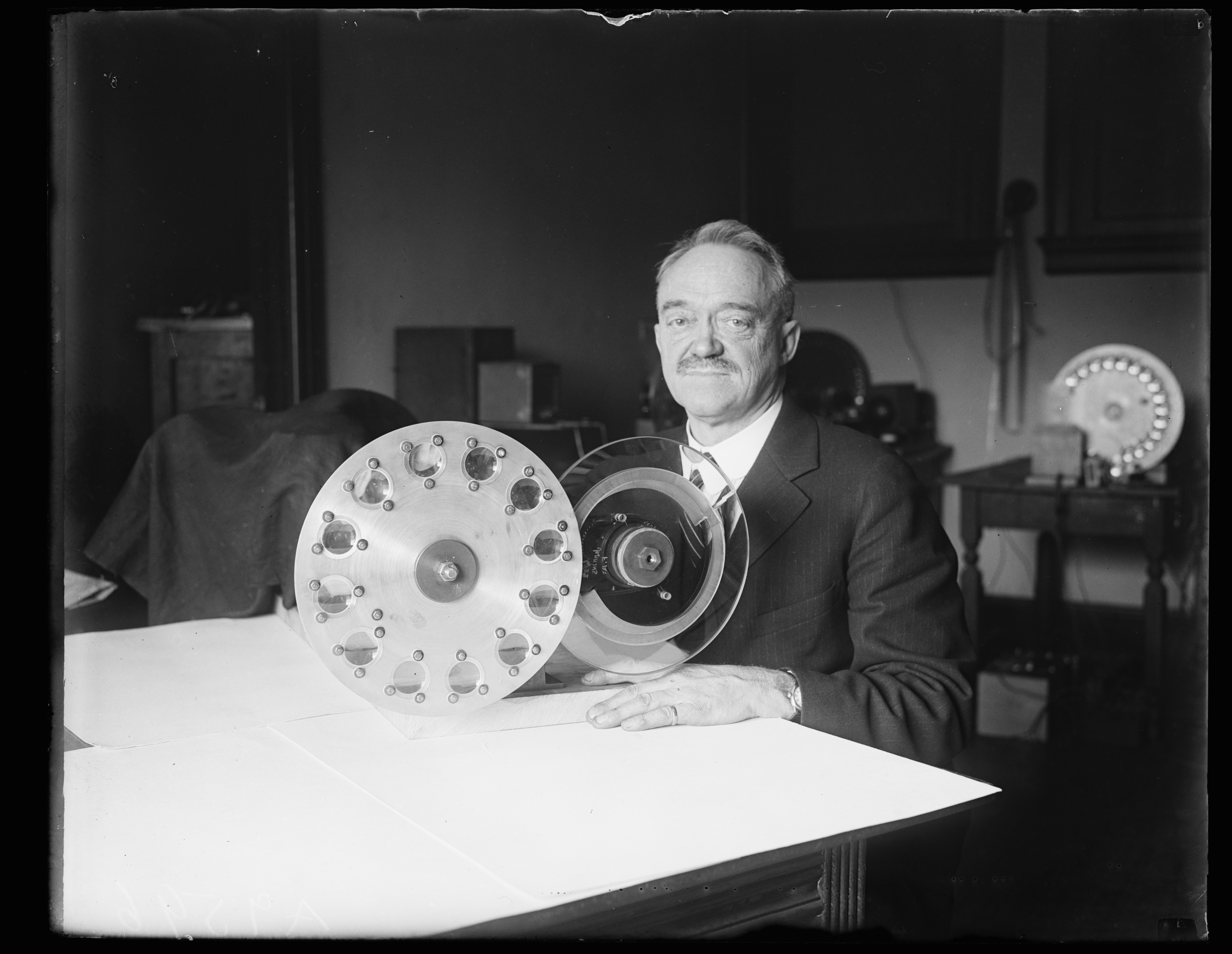
Jenkins and his "Radio Vision" system

- Charles Francis Jenkins demonstrated synchronized transmission of silhouette pictures and sound at the Jenkins Labs in Washington, D.C. Jenkins used a Nipkow disk and transmitted the silhouette image of a toy windmill in motion, over a distance of 5 mi (8.0 km) (from a naval radio station in Maryland to his laboratory in Washington, D.C.), using a lensed disk scanner with a 48-line resolution. He was granted U.S. patent 1,544,156 (Transmitting Pictures over Wireless) 17 days later on June 30.
- Police in Chicago engaged in a gun battle against Mike Genna, John Scalise and Albert Anselmi of Chicago's Genna crime family after the Genna gang had attempted a hit against Bugs Moran and Vincent Drucci of the North Side Gang in retaliation for the May 27 killing of Mike's brother Angelo Genna. At the intersection of Western Avenue and 60th Street, the police had overtaken Mike Genna. In the gunfight, officers Harold Olsen and Charles Walsh were killed and Michael Conway was seriously wounded. Police officer William Sweeney shot and killed Mike Genna, and other police captured Scalise and Anselmi.
- Born: Burton Watson, American translator and writer known for translating Chinese and Japanese literature into English; in New Rochelle, New York, United States (d. 2017)

== June 14, 1925 (Sunday) ==
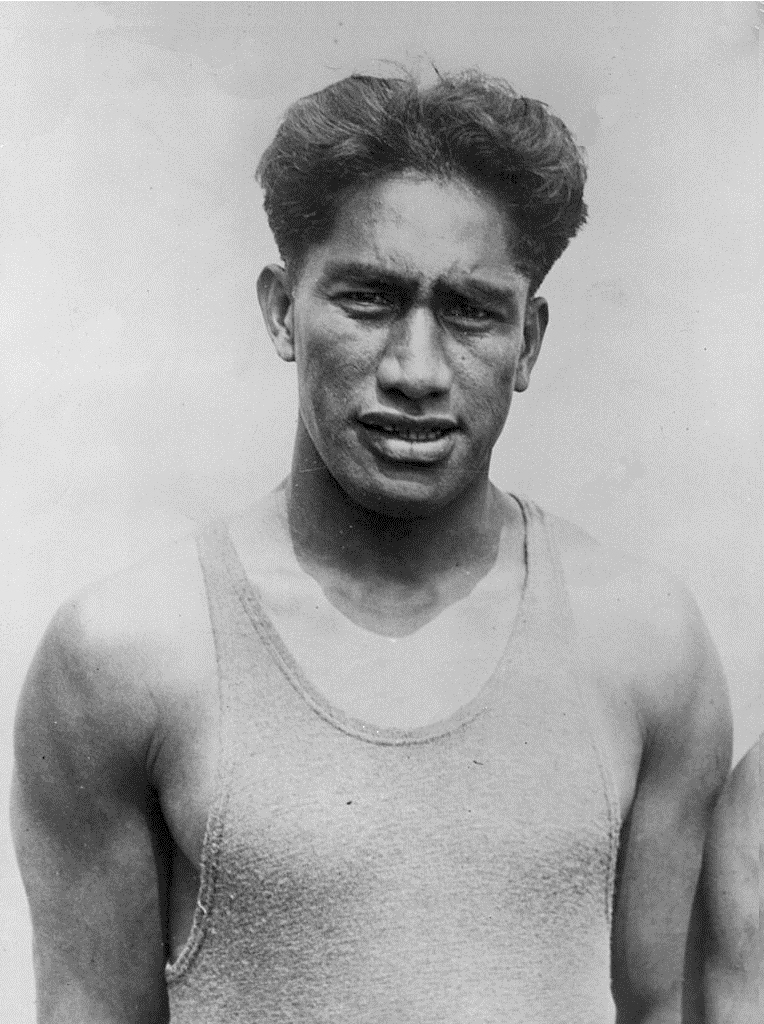
Duke Kahanamoku

- Hawaiian surfer and 1912 Olympic gold medalist swimmer Duke Kahanamoku saved the lives of eight people off of the coast of Newport Beach, California and another four were rescued from drowning by other swimmers, after the fishing yacht Thelma was capsized by a large wave. Another five passengers on the yacht drowned.
- In a spontaneous reaction against the dictatorship of Miguel Primo de Rivera, the crowd at an FC Barcelona game against the Catalonian club Jupiter jeered Spain's national anthem, the "Marcha Real", and applauded the English anthem "God Save the King" as performed by an English marching band. The FC Barcelona soccer football club was fined and shut down for six months in reprisal, and owner Joan Gamper, was forced into exile. He committed suicide five years later.
- A significant German art exhibition of the Neue Sachlichkeit (New Objectivity) movement opened in Mannheim, with paintings by George Grosz, Otto Dix, Max Beckmann, Rudolf Schlichter and others.
- Born: Pierre Salinger, American journalist and politician, served as the U.S. Senator from California in 1964, and served as the White House Press Secretary in the Kennedy and Johnson administrations; in San Francisco, United States (d. 2004)
- Died: A. C. Dixon, 70, American evangelist, known for founding the Christian fundamentalism movement and for the publication of the 1915 book The Fundamentals: A Testimony To The Truth (b. 1854)

== June 15, 1925 (Monday) ==
- Stranded near the North Pole since May 22, the Amundsen Polar Expedition team of six explorers was able to depart on Amundsen's Dornier Wal N-25 seaplane. The six men had landed on the ice in two airplanes at latitude 87°43' N, further north than any humans in history, become stranded, and had spent their time since then using tools to chisel a primitive runway to fly again. Barely managing to take off from their makeshift airstrip in the N-25, the explorers had to leave behind the other aircraft, an N-24 Wal seaplane.
- The Philadelphia Athletics tied the record for greatest comeback in a major league baseball game, after trailing the Cleveland Indians by 12 runs. Trailing 14 to 2, after six innings, the Athletics scored 13 runs in the eighth inning to win, 17 to 15. While no team has come back from being down by more than 12 runs, the 1925 game tied the record set on June 18, 1911 by the Detroit Tigers against the Chicago White Sox (down 13 to 1, came back to win 16 to 15) and would be tied again on August 5, 2001 by the Cleveland Indians (down 14 to 2, came back to win 15 to 14) against the Seattle Mariners.
- Born: Vasily Golubev, Soviet Russian painter; in Medvezhje, Yaroslavl Oblast, USSR (present-day Russia) (d. 1985)

== June 16, 1925 (Tuesday) ==
- A train derailment in the U.S. killed 47 people and severely injured 23 others near Hackettstown, New Jersey, after a violent storm washed debris upon a grade crossing. The train, operated by the Delaware, Lackawanna and Western Railroad had departed from Chicago on June 14 with 182 passengers, nearly all of whom were German-born or Austrian-born Americans and their families who were scheduled to travel on the ocean liner Pacific for a visit to Germany. Less than 60 miles (97 km) from the harbor at Hoboken, the locomotive struck debris and the first three cars with passengers impacted and ruptured the locomotive's boiler. Many of the people who survived the initial impact were scalded and burned to death by the boiling water and steam that swept through broken windows.
- The first of the Soviet Union's Young Pioneer camps, Artek, was opened at the town of Gurzuf on the Black Sea, initially as a health camp for children with tuberculosis. Until the breakup of the Soviet Union in 1991, a stay at the camp in the summer was a privilege for outstanding members of the Young Pioneers, the Communist Party's youth organization for children aged 9 to 14.
- Roald Amundsen and the crew of his attempt to fly over the North Pole landed safely in their N25 seaplane near Nordaustlandet, Svalbard in Norway.
- The International Mercantile Marine Officers' Association was founded at Antwerp in Belgium as a federation of merchant marine trade unions from Belgium, Denmark, France, Germany, the Netherlands, Norway, Spain, and the United States. The affiliated member unions of the IMMOA would merge into the International Transport Workers' Federation in 1946, though the organization itself would exist until 1964.
- Born:
  - Jean d'Ormesson, French novelist, served as director of the newspaper Le Figaro from 1974 to 1977, and dean of the Académie Française from 2009 until his death; in Paris, France (d. 2017)
  - Ifigenia Martínez y Hernández, Mexican politician and economics professor who served as leader of Mexico's Chamber of Deputies for 35 days when she was 99 years old; in Mexico City, Mexico (d. 2024)
  - Bebe Barron, American musician who created the first electronic music recording with her husband, Louis Barron, as well as the first electronic film score for the film Forbidden Planet in 1956; as Charlotte May Wind, in Minneapolis, United States (d. 2008)
- Died:
  - Chittaranjan Das, 54, Bengali activist in the Indian Independence Movement (b. 1870)
  - Emmett Hardy, 22, American jazz cornetist; died of tuberculosis (b. 1903)

== June 17, 1925 (Wednesday) ==
- The Geneva Protocol, officially the "Protocol for the Prohibition of the Use in War of Asphyxiating, Poisonous or other Gases, and of Bacteriological Methods of Warfare", was signed in Switzerland by representatives of 38 nations. The signers represented the major parties in the First World War or their successors (Austria, Belgium, Canada, France, Germany, Hungary, Japan, the Netherlands, Russia, Turkey, the United Kingdom and the United States), as well as by Brazil, Bulgaria, Chile, Denmark, Egypt, El Salvador, Estonia, Ethiopia, Greece, British India, Italy, Latvia, Lithuania, Luxembourg, Nicaragua, Norway, Poland, Portugal, Romania, Spain, Sweden, Switzerland, Siam, Uruguay and Venezuela. It entered into force on February 8, 1928, as a general prohibition on chemical weapons and biological weapons in international armed conflicts.
- The first National Spelling Bee in the United States, sponsored by The Courier Journal, the morning newspaper of Louisville, Kentucky, was held in Washington, D.C. with nine finalists, each of whom had won the spelling bee in their home states. The six girls and three boys met U.S. President Calvin Coolidge before the competition, which was won by 11-year-old Frank Neuhauser of Louisville. The spelling bee came down to Neuhauser competing against Edna Stover of Trenton, New Jersey, on the word "gladiolus", with third place for Helen Fischer of Akron, Ohio and fourth for Mary Daniel of Hartford, Connecticut. Neuhauser won $500 (equivalent to more than $9,000 in 2025) in gold coins.
- The Mastaba of Kaninisut, the tomb of Egyptian state official Ka-ni-nisut who died in the 25th century BC, was opened to the public at the Kunsthistorisches Museum in Vienna, more than 12 years after it had been discovered, dismantled and reassembled.
- In the U.S., George A. Parks became the first Alaska resident to serve as Governor of the Alaska Territory. After growing up in Colorado, Parks had moved to Alaska when he was 24 and would serve until 1933, then live and work there for the rest of his life.
- Viscount Prosper Poullet became Prime Minister of Belgium after the general council of his Socialist Party voted 40 to 26 to approve his formation of a new coalition government.
- The Detroit Tigers set a Major League Baseball record by scoring 11 runs in a single inning in a 19 to 1 win over the New York Yankees. The record would stand until 1953.
- Born:
  - Wolfgang Hildemann, German classical music composer known for his use of the twelve-tone technique, a means of ensuring that all 12 notes of the chromatic scale are sounded equally often in a piece of music while preventing the emphasis of any one note.(d.1995)
  - Alexander Shulgin, American biochemist and pharmacologist; in Berkeley, California (d. 2014)
  - Yvon Gattaz, French businessman who co-founded the electronics manufacturer Radiall and served as president of the Conseil national du patronat français from 1981 to 1986; in Bourgoin-Jallieu, Isère département (d.2024)
  - Irwin "Sonny" Fox, American educator, movie producer and television host known for the children's TV series Wonderama; in Brooklyn (d.2021)
- Died: Adolf Pilar von Pilchau, 74, Baltic German politician who was formerly the self-proclaimed regent of the short-lived United Baltic Duchy.

== June 18, 1925 (Thursday) ==
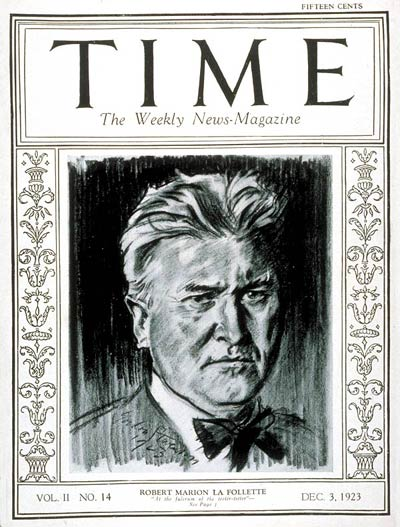
Robert "Fighting Bob" La Follette

- Germany's supreme court, the Reichsgericht, struck down a law for the purpose of confiscation of all the demesne lands of the Dukes of Saxe-Coburg and Gotha, ruling it was unconstitutional. The decision caused much public resentment in Germany and the question of expropriation of the dynastic properties of the former ruling houses of the German Empire became a contentious political subject.
- In the U.S. town of Price, Utah, a lynch mob and a crowd of about 1,000 men, women and children had gathered outside the Carbon County Courthouse after learning that African-American Robert Marshall was being brought by Deputy Sheriff Henry East to be placed in jail. Marshall had been arrested for the murder of white mine watchman James Burns. Warned that members of the crowd were planning to carry out the lynching of Marshall, East exited the police car and left Marshall inside. A group of men then took the car, followed by a procession of at least 100 more cars, drove Marshall to a nearby farm in order to carry out his hanging. Marshall was still breathing after being rescued by three deputies, and five men from the lynch mob hanged him a second time, breaking his neck and killing him instantly. While 11 members of the mob were arrested, they were freed after posting bail on June 30. Nobody was willing to testify against them and no charges were brought.
- Died: Robert M. La Follette, Sr., 70, American lawyer and politician, served as the U.S. Senator from Wisconsin from 1906 until his death and Governor of Wisconsin from 1901 to 1906; died seven months after having won 13 electoral votes in the 1924 U.S. presidential election as the third party candidate for the Progressive Party (b. 1855)

== June 19, 1925 (Friday) ==
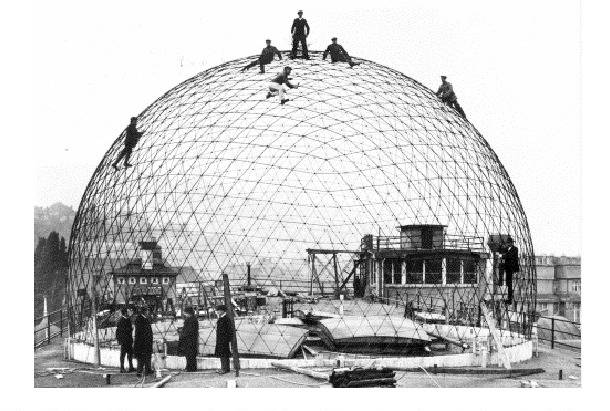
Bauersfeld's geodesic dome

- In Germany, engineer Walther Bauersfeld was awarded Patent No. 415395 for his invention of what is now called a geodesic dome, after having applied on November 9, 1922. The dome was constructed for the roof of the Zeiss-Planetarium, which would open on July 18, 1926 in Jena Almost 30 years after Bauersfeld's patent, American architect R. Buckminster Fuller would receive U.S. Patent No. 2,682,235 for the dome, though he popularized the idea rather than conceiving it first.
- After he had committed his sixth armed robbery, bank robber Everett Bridgewater and two of his accomplices (Clinton Simms and William A. Zander) were arrested in Indianapolis. Bridgewater confessed to the robbery of at least $33,000 in cash and more than $60,000 in securities from four banks (in Upland, Marion, Kokomo and New Harmony), and entered a guilty plea to charges on the Kokomo robbery the next day. He was then sentenced to spend at least 10 years in prison.
- Born:
  - Dr. David Tyrrell, British virologist who discovered the first human coronavirus, initially while researching the viruses that cause the common cold; in Ashford, Middlesex, England (d. 2005)
  - Charlie Drake, popular English comedian and television personality; as Charles Springall, in the Elephant and Castle, London, England (d. 2006)
- Died: Hiroshi Koshiba, 40, one of the founders of the Japanese Scouting movement; died from heart disease (b. 1884)

== June 20, 1925 (Saturday) ==
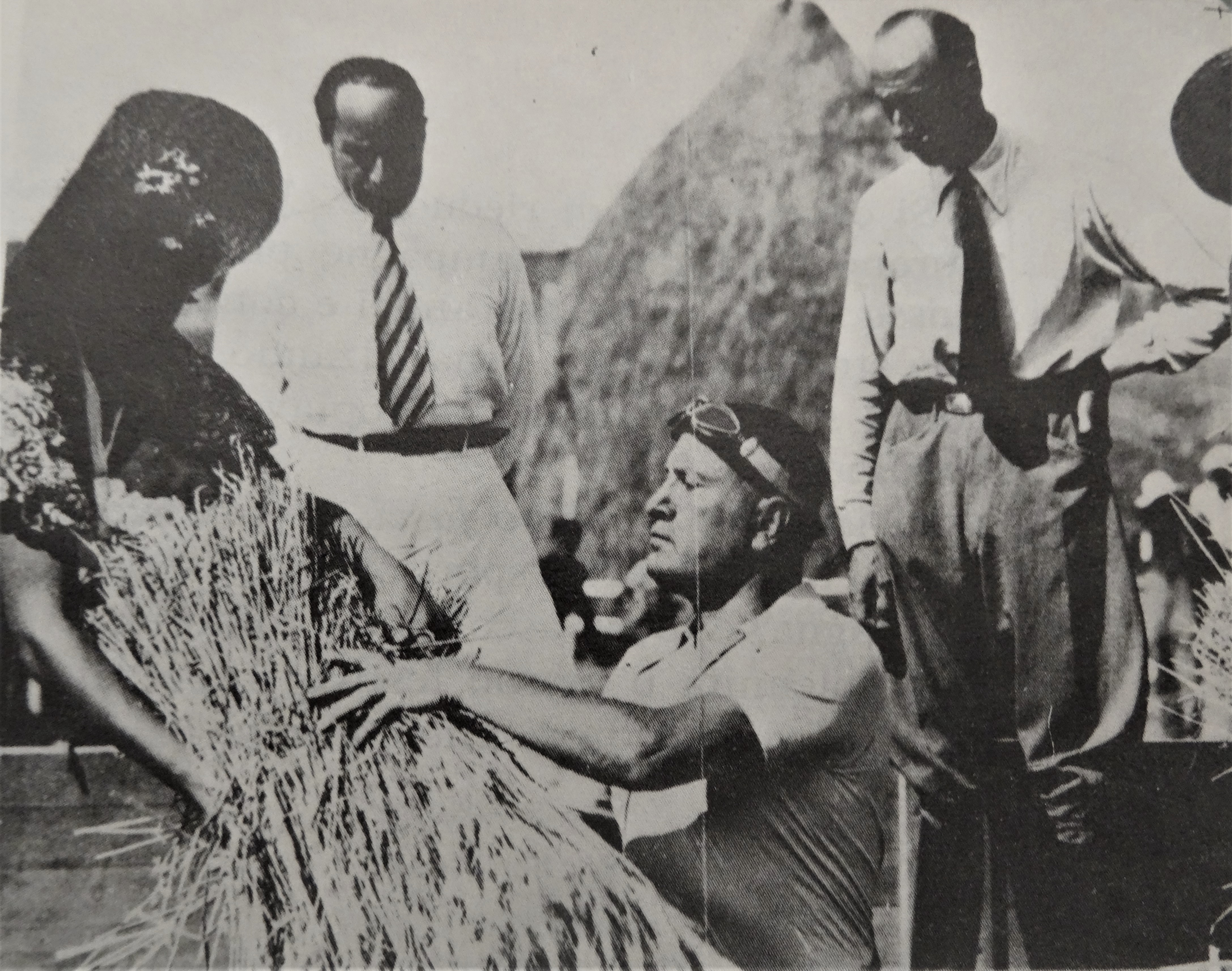
Mussolini harvesting wheat as part of publicizing the Battle for Grain

- Italy's Prime Minister Benito Mussolini launched what he labeled "The Battle for Grain" ("La battaglia del grano"), aimed at increasing Italy's wheat production to the point of becoming completely self-sufficient and no longer needing to import grain. In order to decrease consumption of grain, Mussolini's policy attempted to persuade Italian families to consume grains other than wheat, which was in short supply, but which was the primary ingredient in both bread and pasta. Over the next 10 years, in a campaign to "liberate Italy from the slavery of foreign bread", Mussolini advocated consumption of rice and rice-based substitutes for traditional Italian foods.
- The first radio station in the South American nation of Peru, OAX-AM, began broadcasting from the capital, Lima.
- The Australian comedy film The Adventures of Algy was released.
- Born:
  - Audie Murphy, American soldier and actor, known as the most-decorated hero of World War II; in Kingston, Texas, United States (b. 1971)
  - Robert L. Breeden, American magazine editor and publisher, chief editor of National Geographic magazine, and served as Chairman of the White House Historical Association and the United States Capitol Historical Society; in Montgomery, West Virginia, United States (d. 2013)

== June 21, 1925 (Sunday) ==
- The Vietnamese Revolutionary Youth League was formally established, marking the beginning of the history of Communism in Vietnam.
- An all-white baseball team representing the racist Ku Klux Klan lost a baseball game to an all-black team, the Wichita Monrovians, 10 to 8 in Wichita, Kansas.
- Born:
  - Larisa Avdeyeva, Soviet Russian mezzo-soprano for the Bolshoi Opera; in Moscow, Russian SFSR, Soviet Union (present-day Russia) (d. 2013)
  - Stanley Moss, American poet, publisher, and art dealer; as Stanley Moskowitz, in Woodhaven, New York, United States (d. 2024)
  - Giovanni Spadolini, Italian journalist and politician, served as the 45th Prime Minister of Italy; in Florence, Kingdom of Italy (present-day Italy) (d. 1994)
  - Maureen Stapleton, American actress, winner of two Tony Awards, an Academy Award and a Primetime Emmy Award; as Lois Maureen Stapleton, in Troy, New York, United States (d. 2006)
- Died:
  - George Ashdown Audsley, 86, American artist and engineer known for designing the Wanamaker Organ, the largest fully functioning pipe organ in the world (b. 1838)
  - Peter H. Clark, African American abolitionist, educator, speaker and Socialist politician (b. 1829)

== June 22, 1925 (Monday) ==
- The National Fascist Party of Italy ended its fourth and final party congress in Rome. Such conferences had become increasingly unnecessary as the Fascist Party expanded its power and became essentially the state. In Benito Mussolini's closing speech he first used the word "totalitarian" when he referred to "our ferocious totalitarian will." Roberto Farinacci was confirmed secretary of the party by acclamation.
- Born: Saul Holiff, Canadian music promoter known for serving as the agent and business manager for U.S. country music singer Johnny Cash from 1960 to 1973; in London, Ontario, Canada (d. 2005)
- Died:
  - Felix Klein, 76, German mathematician and theorist in non-Euclidean geometry, known for the Klein bottle and the Kleinian group (b. 1849)
  - Edwin F. Ladd, 65, American chemist and politician, served as the U.S. Senator from North Dakota from 1921 until his death (b. 1859)

== June 23, 1925 (Tuesday) ==
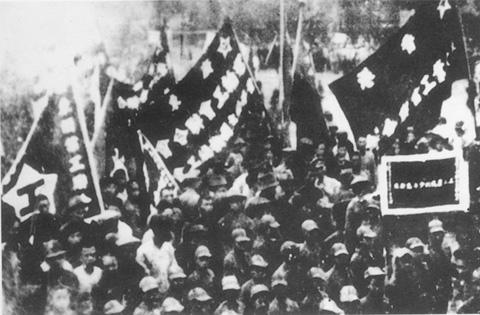
Strikers in Canton

- As Chinese protests against imperialism spread to a strike and boycott known as the Canton–Hong Kong strike, the Shaji Massacre occurred when British troops fired from Shamian Island across the river to Guangzhou, killing 52 people and wounding 117.
- The Soviet Union created the Lenin Prize for accomplishments relating to science, literature, arts, architecture and technology.
- The Irish Free State held its first local elections since becoming independent and since the passage of the Local Government Act 1925.
- The massive Gros Ventre landslide occurred in the U.S. state of Wyoming near Jackson following heavy rains over a period of several weeks and the day after a 4.0 magnitude earthquake. Approximately 38,000,000 m^{3} (1.3×10^{9} cu ft) of sedimentary rock came down from the Teton Mountains and dammed up a river, creating the Lower Slide Lake.
- Born:
  - Oliver Smithies, British geneticist and 2007 Nobel Prize in Physiology or Medicine laureate for his discovery of homologous recombination of transgenic DNA with genomic DNA; in Halifax, West Yorkshire, England (d. 2017)
  - John Shepherd-Barron, India-born British inventor, co-inventor of the automated teller machine (ATM); in Shillong, Assam Province, British India (present-dayMeghalaya state, India) (d. 2010)
  - Bijaya Malla, Nepali novelist, poet, and playwright; in Om Bahal, Kathmandu, Kingdom of Nepal (present-day Nepal) (d. 1999)

== June 24, 1925 (Wednesday) ==
- The United States and Hungary signed a Treaty of Friendship, Commerce and Consular Rights.
- The Five Sisters window at York Minster was dedicated to the women who lost their lives in the line of service during World War I
- Died: Francis Rule, 89-90, Cornish British mining engineer and businessman who developed pumping equipment techniques to exploit flooded and abandoned silver mines (b. 1835)

== June 25, 1925 (Thursday) ==
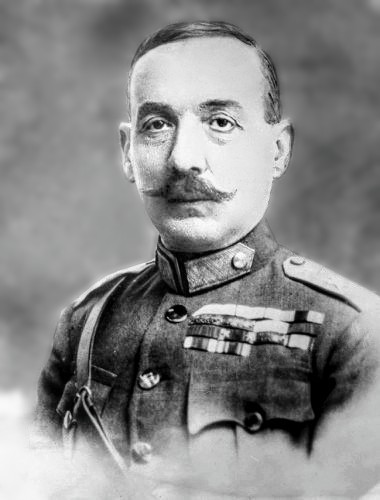
General Pangalos

- General Theodoros Pangalos led a bloodless coup d'etat overthrowing the government of the Second Hellenic Republic. The next day, installed himself as the leader of Greece.
- In Germany, the government of the Free State of Saxony reached an agreement with its last monarch, King Friedrich August III and other members of the family of the House of Wettin on future use of their manors.
- Born:
  - June Lockhart, American actress, known primarily as the co-star of Lassie from 1958 to 1964, and of Lost in Space from 1965 to 1968; in New York City, United States (d. 2025)
  - Alistair Te Ariki Campbell, Cook Islander novelist and poet; in Rarotonga, Cook Islands (d. 2009)
  - Robert Venturi, American architect; in Philadelphia, United States (d. 2018)
  - Dr. Samavedam Srinivasa Sriramacharyulu, Indian pathologist and physician; in Visakhapatnam, Madras Province, British India (present-day Andhra Pradesh, India) (d. 2009)

== June 26, 1925 (Friday) ==
- The president of Greece, Pavlos Kountouriotis, was forced to dismiss Prime Minister Andreas Michalakopoulos after the military takeover of the government. General Pangalos, leader of the coup d'etat, was appointed as the new prime minister and given control of the nation.
- In the capital of the British-ruled Colonial Nigeria, Ibikunle Akitoye was elected by the Lagos Ruling House as the Oba of Lagos, the monarch of the Yoruba people. Akitoye, who would be approved by the British government on August 9, replaced Eshugbayi Eleko, who had been deposed by the Ruling House on June 10, 1925.
- All nine people on the Canadian tugboat Ocean King were killed after it veered into the path of the Canadian Pacific Lines ocean liner Marloch on the Saint Lawrence River. Struck by the bow of Marloch, Ocean King (which had been directed to tow the larger ship) capsized and its boilers exploded as it sank.
- The Charlie Chaplin film The Gold Rush premiered at Grauman's Egyptian Theatre in Hollywood.
- Jim Barnes won the British Open golf tournament.
- Born:
  - Pavel Belyayev, Soviet cosmonaut on the 1965 Voskhod 2 mission; in Chelishchevo, Russian SFSR, Soviet Union (present-day Russia) (d. 1970)
  - Richard X. Slattery, American actor known primarily for roles of police or military officers; in The Bronx, New York City, United States (d. 1997)

== June 27, 1925 (Saturday) ==
- A 6.6 magnitude earthquake struck near Townsend, Montana. There were no casualties but damage was estimated at $150,000.
- The United Union of German Railway Workers (Einheitsverband der Eisenbahner Deutschlands) was formed by a merger of the German Railway Union (Deutscher Eisenbahner-Verband) and the National Union of German Railway Officials and Trainees (Reichsgewerkschaft deutscher Eisenbahnbeamten und anwärter), with almost 200,000 members led by Franz Scheffel. The United Union would exist until June 26, 1933 when it would be banned along with other labor unions.
- Born:
  - Doc Pomus, American rhythm and blues singer and songwriter known for "Save the Last Dance for Me" and "Suspicion," posthumous inductee to the Rock and Roll Hall of Fame, the Songwriters Hall of Fame and the Blues Hall of Fame; as Jerome Felder, in Brooklyn, New York City, United States (d. 1991)
  - Willy Burgdorfer, Swiss-born American medical entomologist known for discovering the bacterial pathogen for Lyme disease; as Wilhelm Burgdorfer, in Basel, Switzerland (d. 2014)
  - Andrew Foster, Deaf African American educator and founder of the Christian Mission for Deaf Africans; in Ensley, Alabama, United States (d. 1987)

== June 28, 1925 (Sunday) ==
- The Independence Tribunal of Diyarbekir, established to conduct trials of the Kurdish participants in the Sheikh Said rebellion against the government of Turkey, issued death sentences to 47 of rebels, including Sheikh Said himself. The sentence was carried out in public the next day with mass hangings from scaffolds erected at the Mountain Gate of Diyarbakir at Dağkapı Square. In all, the tribunals prosecuted more than 5,000 rebels, convicted 2,300 of them and hanged 420 of them.
- In an exchange of territories, Albania ceded Shën Naumit to Yugoslavia, where it was renamed "Sveti Naum". The 920-year-old monastery is now in North Macedonia. In exchange, Yugoslavia ceded Starovo, which was renamed Peshkëpi.
- F.C. Porto defeated Sporting CP of Lisbon, 2 to 1, to win the Campeonato de Portugal, the knockout playoff for soccer football in Portugal.
- Born:
  - Esther Cailingold, British-born schoolteacher who fought in the 1948 Arab-Israeli War; in Whitechapel, London (d. 1948, killed in action)
  - Katinka Mann, American artist and sculptor; in New York City, United States (d. 2022)
- Died:
  - Josef Peer, 61, Austrian lawyer who served as the Landesverweser of Liechtenstein from 1920 to 1921 (b. 1864)
  - George A. Dodd, 72, American officer in the U.S. Army known for leading his troops to victory in the 1916 Battle of Guerrero over Mexican rebels during the Pancho Villa Expedition of John J. Pershing (b. 1852)

== June 29, 1925 (Monday) ==
- A 6.8 magnitude earthquake killed 13 people in Santa Barbara, California and caused at least eight million dollars in damage. The earthquake caused buildings downtown to collapse or to become unsafe for habitation, but struck at 6:44 in the morning before most people had arrived for work. Further casualties were prevented by the quick actions of William Engle in cutting electrical power, and Henry Ketz and William Pflegling in shutting the main valves of the natural gas pipelines.
- Born:
  - Giorgio Napolitano, Italian politician who served as the President of Italy from 2006 to 2015; in Naples, Kingdom of Italy (present-day Italy) (d. 2023)
  - Cara Williams, American actress known for The Defiant Ones in 1958, and as Gladys on the television show Pete and Gladys; as Bernice Kamiat, in Brooklyn, New York City, United States (d. 2021)
  - R. S. Manohar, Indian film actor and playwright; as Rasipuram Subramaniyan Manohar, in Rasipuram, Madras Province, British India (present-day in Tamil Nadu, India) (d. 2006)
- Died:
  - Christian Michelsen, 68, Norwegian shipping magnate and statesman, served as the first Prime Minister of Norway from 1905 to 1907 following Norway's independence from Sweden (b. 1857)
  - John Milholland, 65, American businessman, philanthropist and civil rights activist, served as the first treasurer of the NAACP (b. 1860)

== June 30, 1925 (Tuesday) ==
- The Svenska Teatern in Stockholm, Sweden's national theater and the largest (with 1,100 seats) in the country since its opening in 1875, was destroyed by fire. It was never rebuilt.
- American engineer Charles Francis Jenkins received U.S. Patent No. 1,544,146 for his invention "Transmitting Pictures over Wireless", which he had applied for on March 13, 1922 for a practical system of television.
- The Lions Club U.S. service organization formally launched its signature mission of assistance to the blind and the visually-impaired, after a speech by Helen Keller at its international convention at Cedar Point, Ohio.
- Edith Nourse Rogers defeated Eugene N. Foss in a special election to replace her late husband as the U.S. representative for the 5th District of Massachusetts, an office which she would hold for the next 35 years. Rogers, the sixth woman to be elected to the U.S. Congress, filled out the unexpired term of her husband, Congressman John Jacob Rogers, who had died on March 28, and would be re-elected 16 times.
- Born:
  - Don Hayward, Welsh rugby league player with 15 caps for the Wales national team and three for the British Lions; as Donald Hayward, in Pontypool, Monmouthshire, Wales (d. 1999)
  - Ros Mey, Cambodian-born American Buddhist monk and founder of the first Khmer Buddhist monastery; in Kandal province French protectorate of Cambodia (present-day Cambodia) (d. 2010)
- Died: Major General Firudin bey Vazirov, 75, Azerbaijani-born Imperial Russian Army officer (b. 1850)
