= Padukone =

Padukone is a coastal village in Byndoor Taluk of Udupi district in the Indian state of Karnataka. It is also a surname originating from Karnataka, Maharashtra, Goa. The village lies near Maravanthe and is situated along the banks of the Souparnika River, which surrounds parts of the settlement and contributes to its distinctive riverine landscape.

Historically, the only means of reaching it was by boat from Maraswami. In 2016 a bridge was constructed between Maravanthe and Padukone over the Souparnika River, improving connectivity to the village.

A portion of Nada Grama and Hadavu Grama is under Padukone Village. Padukone is surrounded by coconut trees, water, and kudru.

Notable people include:

- Deepika Padukone, Indian actress, daughter of Prakash
- Prakash Padukone, Indian badminton player, father of Deepika
- Atmaram Padukone, Indian Film Ditector
- Gurudutt Padukone, Indian actor
- Sanchita Padukone, Indian actress
