= Kudru =

Tulu movie

- Directed by: Bhaskar Naik
- Produced by: Bhaskar Naik
- Starring: Priya Hegde
- Edited by: Srinivas Kalal
- Release date: 2023
- Country: India
- Language: Tulu

Kudru is a 2023 Tulu-language film directed by Bhaskar Naik and was released in theatres on 9 October 2023. The cast and crew of the film were mostly newcomers.

== Plot ==
The story revolves around three youngsters, Sadananda, Arun, Arif, and Reshma, who are childhood friends but belong to different communities, living on an island called Kudru, where all communities live in harmony.

== Cast ==
- Priya Hegde
- Vinutha Gowda
- Daina D'Souza
