= Paul Harry Henson =

Paul Harry Henson (July 22, 1925 - April 12, 1997) was an American engineer and telecommunications executive who built the first large scale fiber optic network as chairman of the Sprint Corporation.

== Biography ==
He was born on July 22, 1925, in Lincoln, Nebraska. He served in the United States Army Air Corps during World War II. He attended the University of Nebraska and received both a bachelor's and master's degrees in electrical engineering. He died on April 12, 1997, in Palm Springs, California.

In 1965 the Paul Henson YMCA was constructed in Prairie Village, Kansas bearing his name thanks to his contributions to the YMCA.
