= S. Srinivasa Sriramacharyulu =

Indian scientist

Samavedam Srinivasa Sriramachayulu
- S. Srinivasa Sriramacharyulu
- Born: June 25, 1925; Visakhapatnam, Andhra Pradesh, India
- Died: 23 December 2009 (aged 84); New Delhi
- Occupations: Pathologist; Medical researcher
- Spouse: Pushpa

Samavedam Srinivasa Sriramacharyulu (25 June 1925– 23 December 2009) was an Indian medical scientist. He was the first Additional Director of the Indian Council of Medical Research. He was the founding director of the Institute of Pathology. In 1985, he was awarded the Padma Sri, India's fourth-highest civilian award, for his outstanding contribution to the medical sciences and research.

== Early life ==
He was born on 25 June 1925, in Visakhapatnam, Andhra Pradesh. His graduate and post-graduate education came at Visakhapatnam Medical College. He earned his D.Sc. in Pathology while working as an Assistant Research Officer at the Nutritional Research Laboratories, Coonoor. He received a Tata Lady Memorial Trust Research Fellowship in 1950 under Professor M.D. Anantachari. In 1959, he went to the Armed Forces Institute of Pathology in Washington DC, USA for training in neuropathology.

== Career ==
He was Director of the Institute of Pathology (1965–82). He acted as the First Additional Director General (1985) of the Indian Council of Medical Research. In 1976, he received fellowships from institutions such as the Indian National Science Academy of Medical Sciences, the Indian Academy of Sciences, the Andhra Pradesh Academy of Medical Sciences, etc., and performed medical research.

He was involved in autopsies on victims of the Kanishaka air crash, Sivarasan of Rajiv Gandhi assassination, and the Bhopal disaster. The latter affected him for the rest of his life and he got immersed in understanding the causes of deaths due to methyl isothiocyanate (MIC), but also the long-term effects on the survivors.

He died on 23 December 2009, in New Delhi.

== Awards ==
- Padma Sri in 1985
