= Maharani Wisma Susana Siregar =

Indonesian-Dutch independence activist (born 1925)

- Born: 5 June 1925 (age 101); Liverpool, England
- Citizenship: Netherlands; Indonesia
- Occupation: Independence activist
- Spouses: Firdaus Harahap (divorced) (m. 1963) Sukarno (m. 1958; div. 1962)
- Children: 5

Maharani Wisma Susana Siregar (born 5 June 1925) was the fifth wife of Sukarno, the first President of Indonesia, from 1958 until 1962.

== Early life ==
Siregar was born on 5 June 1925 in Liverpool, England, the daughter of Nuriah Sabiah Nasution and Hasan Basari Siregar, a civil servant. She took ballet and voice lessons, and studied in the Soviet Union.

== Personal life ==
Siregar was introduced to President Sukarno, a friend of her father's as a child. Her parents rejected his marriage proposal because they did not want her to be in a polygamous marriage. Siregar later married Firdaus Harahap, an East Nusa Tenggara police chief, and they had three daughters: Roswita, Linda, and Mona. Sukarno later moved his family to Jakarta and sent Hoegeng Iman Santoso, Sutan Sjahrir, and Hamengkubuwono IX to persuade Harahap to divorce Siregar. Sukarno was 23 years her senior, and already had a daughter, Siti Aisyah Margaret Rose, who became a banker. They spent their time jogging at Bogor Palace and ate sunny side eggs cooked by her. When Sukarno married Naoko Nemoto in 1962, Siregar divorced him. She later remarried Harahap and gave birth to another daughter, Meli.

== Indonesian independence movement ==
In opposition to Dutch colonialism, she tore up the Dutch flag and replaced it with an Indonesian flag, which earned her an award. After that she maintained a low profile life.

In an interview in 2010, Siregar stated that she felt sad seeing the poor condition of the Indonesian people, which motivated her to adopt a simple life. She gave Sukarno's inheritance to her own children and orphan children, and wished to be buried next to him when she died.
