= Menhat Helmy =

Egyptian artist

Menhat Helmy (منحة حلمي)
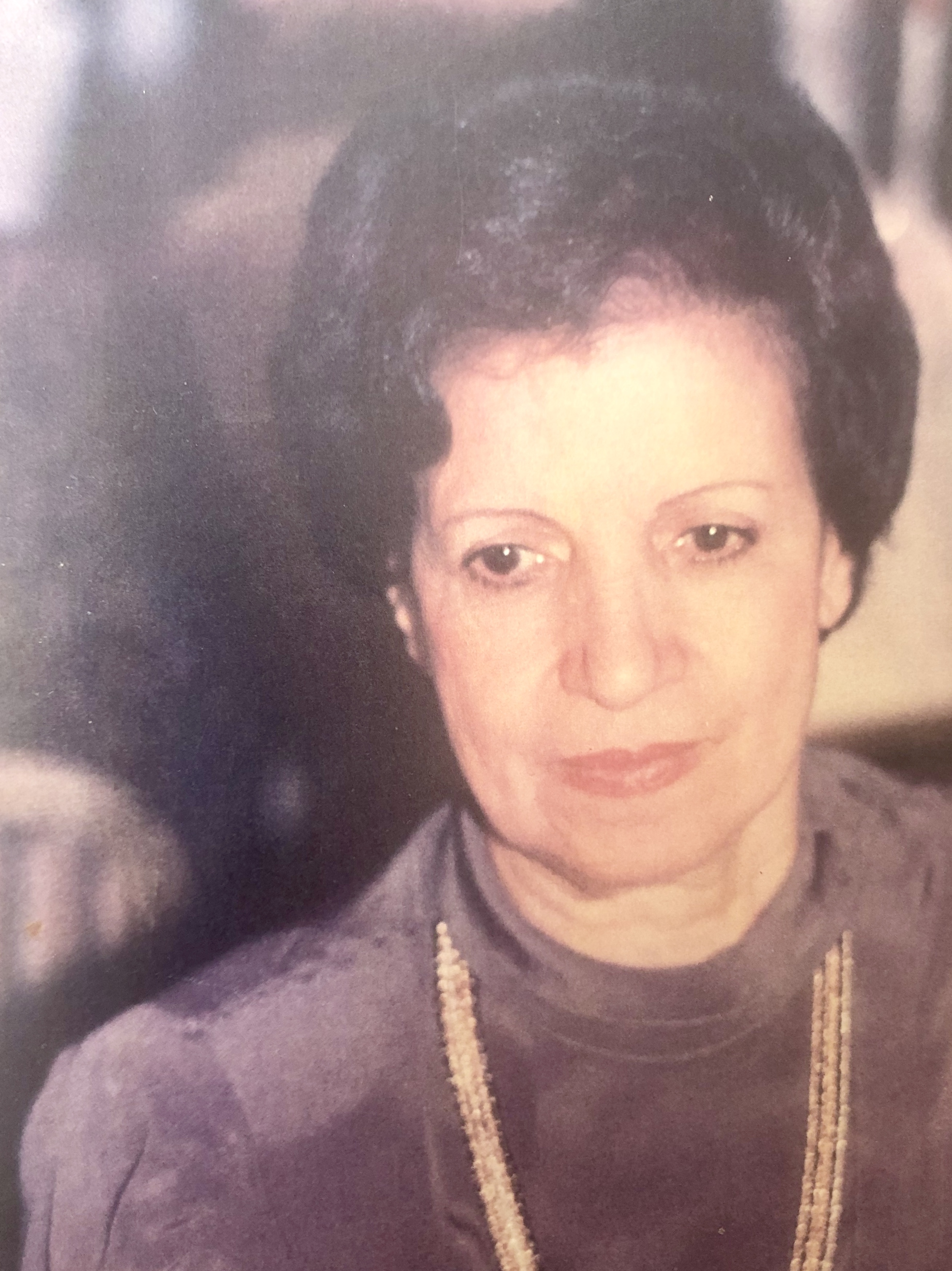
- Born: Menhat Allah Helmy; July 11, 1925; Cairo
- Died: May 10, 2004 (aged 78)
- Education: Slade School of Fine Arts
- Known for: Paintings, Printmaking, Etchings, Drawing
- Movement: Abstraction, Egyptian graphics
- Awards: Slade School of Fine Arts Prize for Etching (1955), Salon Du Caire Prize (1959 and 1960), Cairo Production Exhibition Prize (1957), Ljublyana Honorary Prize (1961), National Merit Prize for Etching, Egypt (1981)

Menhat Helmy (1925-2004) was an artist and pioneer in Egyptian etchings and printmaking.

== Early life and education ==
Menhat Helmy was born in Helwan, Egypt in on July 11, 1925 as the middle child in a family of seven sisters and two brothers. She graduated from Cairo's High Institute of Pedagogic Studies for Art in 1949 before continuing her education abroad at the Slade School of Fine Art between 1953–55, where she focused on drawing, painting, and etching. She later studied coloured graphics at Morley College in London during her second stay in London between 1973-79.

== Career ==
Along with likes of Hussein El Gebaly, Abdullah Gohar, and Mariam A. Aleem, Helmy was part of a pioneering generation of artists who played a pivotal role in the field. Helmy's black-and-white etchings were critically acclaimed for their complexity, as well for their difficulty in realization. Helmy was one of the first artists to engrave entire scenes into her work, replicating the effects of sketches and elaborate drawings on zinc before transforming them into prints.

After winning the Slade Prize of Etching in 1955, Menhat Helmy went on to participate in exhibitions around the world. She took part in most local exhibitions in Egypt from 1956 onwards and held her first private etching exhibition in 1966. She participated in many international biennales of etchings in West Germany, Yugoslavia, Poland, Italy, Tokyo, and India. She won the Saloon Du Caire award in 1959 and 1960, the Cairo Production Exhibition prize in 1957, and the Ljublyana Honorary Prize in 1961. Helmy went on to become a lecturer at the Fine Arts Institute in Cairo, a Professor of Fine Arts at the Helwan University in Cairo, an Honorary Professor of Etching at the Accademia delle Arti del Disegno in Florence, Italy, and a member of the Print Maker Council in the United Kingdom.

While Helmy retired from printmaking in the 1980s due to a lung condition contracted from the chemicals used in her etchings, she continued to teach at Helwan University until her death in 2004 at the age of 78.

Helmy's work is represented in the Museum of Modern Arts in Egypt and is in private collections in Egypt, Germany, Britain, the U.A.E., and the United States. One of her abstract etching, 'To the Point,' was donated to Cairo University by her daughter, Sara Khallaf. Her painting, 'Procession to Work,' was sold at auction house Christies in 2007. Her abstract painting, 'Space Exploration,' was acquired by Sultan Sooud Al-Qassemi of the Barjeel Art Foundation in 2019.

== Exhibitions ==
1. Participated in most local exhibitions in Egypt from 1956 onwards.
2. Solo Show, Etchings at Akhnaton Hall, Cairo, Egypt, 1966.
3. Solo Show, Etchings and Graphics, London, 1978.
4. Solo Show, Etchings at Goethe Institute, Cairo, Egypt, 1979.
5. Solo Show, at University Austral of Chile, Chile, 1985.
6. Retrospective Show, Horizon One Gallery, Cairo, Egypt, 2005.
7. Participated in many biennales including Alexandria Biennale, Ljublyana (Yugoslavia), Grakow (Poland), Frechen (West Germany), Tokyo (Japan), Biella (Italy) and Fredrikstad (Norway).
8. Participated at the Venice Biennali, Italy.
9. Participated at the Third World Biennale of Graphic Art, 1980, Iraqi Cultural Center, London.
10. Participated at the Dublin Biennale (Ireland), 1982, Bradford (England), 1982 and 1986.
11. Participated at the Contemporary Arab Artists exhibition in London, 1982
12. Participated at the India Triennale, 1982.

== Awards ==
1. Slade School of Fine Arts Prize for Etching, 1955.
2. Salon Du Caire Prize for 1959 and 1960.
3. Cairo Production Exhibition Prize, 1957.
4. Ljublyana Honorary Prize, 1961.
5. Honorary Professor at the Accademia delle Arti del Disegno, 1963 for works exhibited at the Ljublyana Biennali for Graphics.
6. National Merit Prize for Etching, Egypt, 1981.

== Publications and cultural activities ==
1. Drawings of the Anatomy Book for Artists, 1961.
2. Curator for the Egyptian Show at the 5th Triennali in New Delhi, India; 1982.
3. Book cover for one of The Canal Medical College, 1980-1983.
4. Member of Acquisition Committee in Egypt for three consecutive years; 1985-1988.
5. Member of Fine Arts Committee in Egypt for two consecutive years; 1986-1988.
6. Member of the Print Makers Council, United Kingdom.
7. Member of the World Print Council, U.S.A.
