= List of science centres in India =

This is a comprehensive list of science centres and museums in India, most of which are operated by the National Council of Science Museums (NCSM). As part of India's science education infrastructure, these centres play a crucial role in promoting scientific literacy and informal learning.

The network represents one of the largest chains of science centres under a single administrative umbrella globally, contributing significantly to public understanding of science and STEM education in India.

== Historical background ==
The foundation for India's science museum network was laid with the establishment of the Birla Industrial & Technological Museum in Kolkata in 1959. This was followed by the Visvesvaraya Industrial and Technological Museum in Bangalore in 1965. The success of these early institutions led to the creation of NCSM in 1978, marking the beginning of a coordinated effort to establish science centres across the country.

== Classification and hierarchy ==
Science centres in India are classified into different categories based on their scope, infrastructure, and administrative level. Each category serves specific functions and target audiences, with higher-level centres often providing support and resources to smaller units.

- Science Cities: Large-scale science centres featuring extensive interactive exhibits, multimedia displays, and outdoor science parks. These facilities often span several acres and include multiple galleries, theatres, and research spaces. Examples include Science City, Kolkata, which attracts over 1 million visitors annually.
- National Centres: Major institutions serving as regional hubs for scientific education and research. These centres typically house permanent galleries, temporary exhibition spaces, and advanced laboratory facilities. They often coordinate with international institutions and lead research initiatives.
- Regional Centres: Facilities serving specific geographical regions with comprehensive exhibits and educational programmes. These centres focus on regional scientific achievements and local technological heritage while maintaining national-standard facilities.
- Sub-Regional Centres: Medium-sized facilities designed to bridge the gap between regional and district levels. They typically serve multiple districts and offer specialised programmes tailored to local educational needs.
- District Centres: Local-level institutions focusing on district-wide outreach and basic science education. These centres work closely with local schools and communities to promote scientific literacy through hands-on learning experiences.
- Satellite Units: Smaller centres operating under the administrative control of national centres. They extend the reach of larger institutions to smaller cities and towns, offering selected exhibits and educational programmes.
- Mobile Science Exhibitions: Travelling exhibits designed to bring science education to remote and underserved areas. These units typically consist of specially designed buses or vans equipped with exhibits, demonstrations, and audiovisual facilities. In 2022-23, mobile units reached over 2,000 locations across India.

== Science centres in states ==
Science Centre	State	Location	Type	Inauguration Date
Regional Science Centre	Andhra Pradesh	Tirupati	Regional Centre	1993
Arunachal Pradesh Science Centre	Arunachal Pradesh	Itanagar	Science Centre	December 3, 2005
Regional Science Centre	Assam	Guwahati	Regional Centre	March 15, 1994
Jorhat Science Centre & Planetarium	Assam	Jorhat	Science Centre with Planetarium	July 6, 2013
Srikrishna Science Centre	Bihar	Patna	Science Centre	April 14, 1978
Bodhgaya Science Centre	Bihar	Bodhgaya	Science Centre	July 20, 2023
Chhattisgarh Science Centre	Chhattisgarh	Raipur	Science Centre	July 13, 2012
Nehru Science Centre	Maharashtra	Mumbai	National Centre	November 11, 1985
Visvesvaraya Industrial and Technological Museum	Karnataka	Bangalore	National Centre	1965
Goa Science Centre	Goa	Panjim	Science Centre	2002
District Science Centre	Gujarat	Dharampur	District Centre	1984
Kurukshetra Panorama & Science Centre	Haryana	Kurukshetra	Science Centre	2000
Regional Science Centre	Jharkhand	Ranchi	Regional Centre	November 29, 2010
District Science Centre	Karnataka	Gulbarga	District Centre	1984
Dharwad Regional Science Centre	Karnataka	Dharwad	Regional Centre	February 27, 2012
Regional Science Centre	Karnataka	Pilikula	Regional Centre	October 1, 2014
Regional Science Centre	Kerala	Chalakudy	Regional Centre	February 2021
Kerala Science City	Kerala	Kottayam	Science City	September 2025
Regional Science Centre and Planetarium	Kerala	Kozhikode	Regional Centre with Planetarium	1997
Regional Science Centre	Madhya Pradesh	Bhopal	Regional Centre	January 12, 1995
Manaskhand Science Centre	Madhya Pradesh	Umaria	Science Centre	March 10, 2024
Raman Science Centre & Planetarium	Maharashtra	Nagpur	Science Centre with Planetarium	1992
Pimpri Chinchwad Science Centre	Maharashtra	Pune	Science Centre	February 8, 2013
Sub-Regional Science Centre	Maharashtra	Solapur	Sub-Regional Centre	February 14, 2010
Manipur Science Centre	Manipur	Imphal	Science Centre	May 18, 2005
Shillong Science Centre	Meghalaya	Shillong	Science Centre	February 27, 2006
Mizoram Science Centre	Mizoram	Aizawl	Science Centre	July 26, 2003
Nagaland Science Centre	Nagaland	Dimapur	Science Centre	September 14, 2004
Regional Science Centre	Odisha	Bhubaneswar	Regional Centre	September 18, 1989
Dhenkanal Science Centre	Odisha	Dhenkanal	Science Centre	June 5, 1995
Kapilas Science Park	Odisha	Dhenkanal	Science Park	June 5, 1995
Bargarh Science Centre	Odisha	Bargarh	Science Centre	January 21, 2020
Regional Science Centre	Rajasthan	Jaipur	Regional Centre	December 29, 2012
Sub-Regional Science Centre	Rajasthan	Jodhpur	Sub-Regional Centre	August 17, 2013
Sikkim Science Centre	Sikkim	Gangtok	Science Centre	February 22, 2008
District Science Centre	Tamil Nadu	Tirunelveli	District Centre	1987
Regional Science Centre	Tamil Nadu	Coimbatore	Regional Centre	May 6, 2013
Regional Science City	Uttar Pradesh	Lucknow	Science City	1989
Regional Science Centre	Uttarakhand	Dehradun	Regional Centre	February 3, 2016
Science City	West Bengal	Kolkata	Science City	July 1, 1997
Birla Industrial & Technological Museum	West Bengal	Kolkata	National Centre	May 2, 1959
Central Research and Training Laboratory	West Bengal	Kolkata	Research Laboratory	January 1, 1988
North Bengal Science Centre	West Bengal	Siliguri	Science Centre	August 17, 1997
Sub-Regional Science Centre	West Bengal	Kalimpong	Sub-Regional Centre	October 2, 2008
Bardhaman Science Centre	West Bengal	Babur Bagh	Science Centre	January 9, 1994
Digha Science Centre & National Science Camp	West Bengal	New Digha	Science Centre	August 31, 1997
District Science Centre	West Bengal	Purulia	District Centre	December 15, 1982

== Science centers in union territories ==
Science Center	Union Territory	Location	Type	Inauguration Date
Science Centre	Andaman and Nicobar Islands	Port Blair	Science Centre	May 30, 2003
National Science Centre	Delhi	Delhi	National Centre	January 9, 1992
Sub-Regional Science Centre	Puducherry	Puducherry	Sub-Regional Centre	May 3, 2015

== Special facilities and programmes ==
=== Specialised facilities ===
The science centres across India feature various specialised facilities designed to enhance visitor experience and educational impact:

Planetariums Several centres house modern planetarium facilities with digital projection systems:

- Raman Science Centre & Planetarium, Nagpur - Features a 12.5-meter dome
- Regional Science Centre and Planetarium, Kozhikode - Offers bilingual shows
- Jorhat Science Centre & Planetarium, Assam - Specialises in astronomy education
- Swami Vivekananda Planetarium, Mangalore - Digital full-dome projection system

Innovation Hubs Dedicated spaces for fostering creativity and innovation among students:

- Creative Design Labs
- Robotics Workshops
- 3D Printing Facilities
- Electronics Labs

Specialised Galleries Themed exhibition spaces focusing on specific scientific domains:

- Fun Science Galleries
- Evolution Parks
- Dinosaur Galleries
- Maritime Galleries
- Space Exploration Centres

Research Facilities

- Advanced laboratories for student experiments
- Weather monitoring stations
- Astronomical observatories
- Mathematical modelling centres

=== Educational programmes ===
The centres offer various educational programmes and initiatives:

- Regular Programmes
  - Science demonstration lectures
  - Sky observation programmes
  - Teachers' training workshops
  - Science quiz competitions
  - Mobile science exhibitions
- Special Events
  - National Science Day celebrations (February 28)
  - World Environment Day programmes
  - National Mathematics Day activities
  - Space Week celebrations

== International collaborations ==
NCSM has established several international collaborations:

- Rajiv Gandhi Science Centre, Mauritius - Technical support and exhibition development
- India Gallery, International Buddhist Museum, Sri Lanka - Cultural and scientific exchange
- Collaborative projects with science museums worldwide

== Future developments ==
As part of ongoing expansion efforts, several new centres are planned or under construction:

=== Upcoming projects ===
New Science Cities

- Regional Science City, Guwahati (Under Construction)
- Science City, Jammu (Proposed)
- Science City, Dehradun (Planning Phase)

Sub-Regional Science Centers

- Upcoming centres in:
  - Varanasi, Uttar Pradesh
  - Nashik, Maharashtra
  - Mysuru, Karnataka
  - Imphal, Manipur
  - Silvassa, Dadra and Nagar Haveli

District Science Centres

- Focus on underserved areas in:
  - North-Eastern states
  - Tribal districts
  - Rural regions
  - Himalayan states

=== Infrastructure upgrades ===
Several existing centres are scheduled for modernisation:

- Digital planetarium installations
- Interactive gallery renovations
- Virtual reality facilities
- Augmented reality exhibits

=== Outreach expansion ===
- New mobile science exhibition units
- Digital learning platforms
- Virtual laboratory programmes
- Science demonstration kits for schools

== Impact and outreach ==
The science centre network has significant impact on science education in India:

- Annual visitors: Over 14 million (2019)
- School programmes: 5000+ annually
- Mobile science exhibitions: Reaching 2000+ remote locations
- Training programmes: 500+ teachers annually

== Summary statistics ==
As of 2026, India has:

- 3 Science Cities
- 6 National Centres
- 15 Regional Centres
- 5 Sub-Regional Centres
- 5 District Centres
- 20+ Science Centres
- 1 Research Laboratory
- 1 Science Park

Centres by Special Facilities:

- 4 Centres with Planetariums
- 1 Research & Training Laboratory
- 1 Panorama Centre

== See also ==
- Science education in India
- National Council of Science Museums
- List of museums in India
- Science and technology in India
- Education in India
- Ministry of Culture (India)
