= Goa Science Centre =

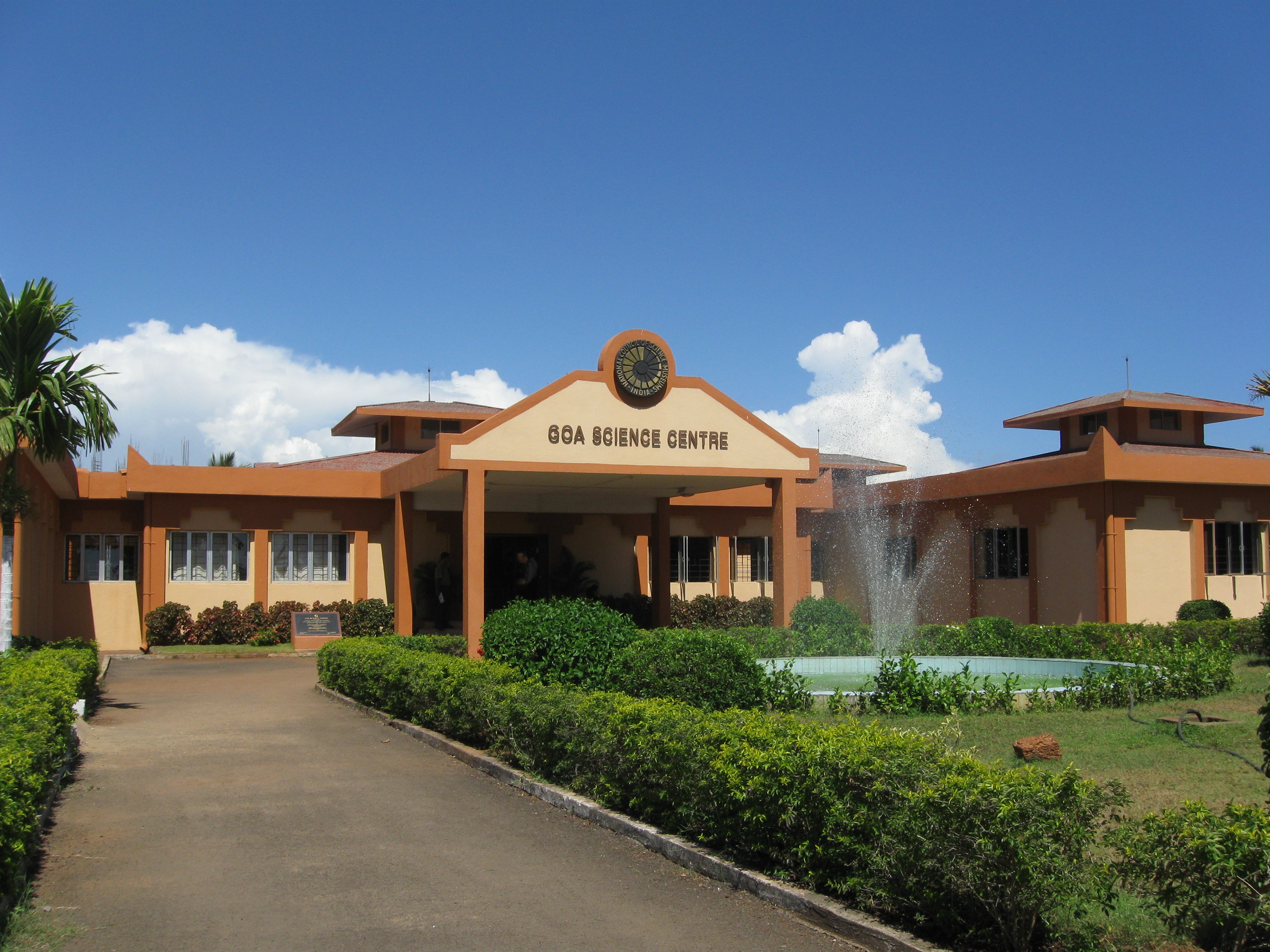
- Entrance to Goa Science Center
- Established: 19 December 2001
- Location: Miramar, Panjim, Goa
- Coordinates: 15.477427°N 73.809075°E
- Type: Science museum
- Visitors: 1,250,000 (2016)
- Website: gscgoa.org

The Goa Science Centre is a science museum, located on New Marine Highway, Miramar, Panjim. It is a joint project of a division of India's National Council of Science Museums (NCSM) and Goa's Department of Science Technology & Environment.

== Objective ==
The centre aims to "...inculcate a scientific temper particularly among the young generation and to popularize science by bringing the excitement of Science & Technology for the common people."

== Science Centre ==
The Science Centre covers 5 acres (2.0 ha) of land, provided by the Government of Goa. It includes a park with exotic flowers, where visitors can learn and interact with large exhibits of principles of physics. Most exhibits give visitors the opportunity to participate actively, e.g. requiring people to lift themselves using pulleys and ropes. Activities are tailored to children, so they enjoy exploring, experiencing and learning about science.

The centre also houses interactive exhibits inside the building and presents Science Shows for young children daily. The Digital Planetarium, 3-D Film Shows, Science Demonstration Lectures, Science Film Shows, Taramandal Shows and the Cyberlab Shows are suitable for all ages.

The Science Centre has an air-conditioned auditorium seating 140, where the Science Film Shows and other multimedia presentations are shown. The Cyberlab is a Multimedia Computer Lab designed to demonstrate and spread IT awareness to the public. There are two thematic galleries: Fun Science and Science of Oceans.

== See also ==
- Swami Vivekananda Planetarium, Mangalore
