= Nagpur Central Museum =

Museum in Nagpur, Maharashtra, India

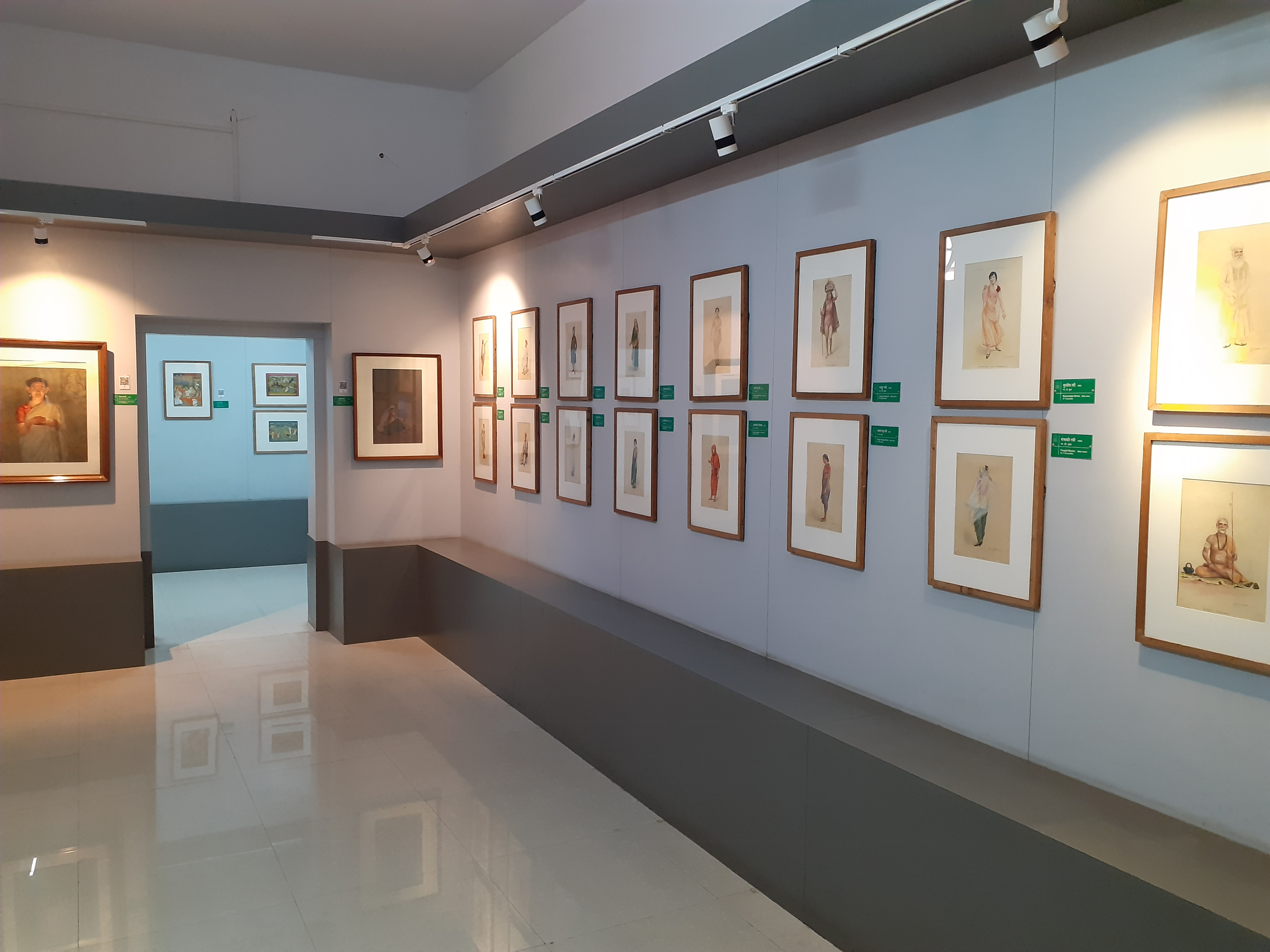
- Established: 1863
- Location: Nagpur, Maharashtra, India
- Coordinates: 21.1510°N 79.0782°E
- Collection size: 30000+
- Curator: Mr. Mayuresh Khadke
- Owners: Dirctorate of Archaeology and Museums, Government of Maharashtra

The Nagpur Central Museum, popularly known as Ajab Bangala, is located in Nagpur, Maharashtra, India. Established in 1863, Nagpur Central Museum is one of the oldest museums in India and Maharashtra. It holds important artifacts such as dinosaurs' fossils, coins, ancient inscriptions, sculptures, arms, tribal artifacts from per-historic to the modern time. The Nagpur Central Museum is the oldest and largest museum in the Central India region.

== History ==
The idea of founding a museum at Nagpur was first recommended by the antiquarian society of the Central Provinces in 1862. Under instruction of Sir Richard Temple, then the Chief commissioner of the Central Province, a committee was constituted for establishment of museum and library at Nagpur. Based on the committee's plan, Nagpur Central Museum was established in 1863. Spearheaded by Sir Richard Temple, the royal families in the central India, native chiefs, landlord and all the district holders took a great interest in collection of the rare objects for the newly formed museum. The collections were enriched by acquiring exhibits from the exhibitions held at Nagpur and Jabalpur in 1865-66. Collection in the museum was sourced from Chhattisgarh, Vidarbha, Madhya Pradesh and even some parts of Western Maharashtra.

After its inception the museum was under care of the Director of Public Instruction of the Central Province; but in 1883, it was transferred to the Director of Agriculture. In 1919, the museum was again transferred to the department of Industries. Since the independence in 1947, the museum activities are mostly directed towards reorganizing of the galleries on the modern line. Presently, the museum is under control of the Director of Archaeology and Museum, Government of Maharashtra.

Recently, the Central Museum has undergone a major renovation work, which include provisions for gardens and a cafeteria. As a part of digitization drive, 10 interactive information kiosks are now installed in the museum. The Central Museum is the first museum in Maharashtra to install Quick Response (QR) Code in display galleries, which provide information about artifacts in Marathi, Hindi, English and 13 foreign languages. However, due to inadequacy of display facilities and galleries several important artifacts are still locked within the reserve collection.

== The building ==
The museum is situated in a huge colonial style building designed by Capt. Cobbe in Civil lines area of Nagpur. The museum galleries have over 8,000 square feet of display space.

== Collections ==
The museum is spread over eleven galleries, each with different themes.

=== Natural history collection ===
This gallery has a rare collection of dinosaurs’ fossils, mineral stones, antlers, reptiles, fish and invertebrates specimen. One of the dinosaur's fossils is almost 67.5 million years old. The fossil belongs to Jainosaurus (a large Titanosaurian dinosaur of India and wider Asia) which was excavated in the Jabalpur district of Madhya Pradesh back in 1932-33. This gallery showcases glimpse of flora and fauna of Central India through its huge collection of stuffed animals and birds.

=== Nagpur heritage collection ===
A special gallery dedicated to the history of Nagpur is also designed in the museum. Here, tourists can see antiquities from the Chalcolithic sites of Sarasvati–Indus and Kaundinyapura excavations, megalithic sarcophagus, stone and copper plate inscriptions, coins of different ages, and metals, etc.

=== Sculpture collection ===
This gallery has a collection of stone sculptures of Buddha, Vishnu and other mythological figures from Maurya period to Maratha time.

=== Arm and armor collection ===
This gallery has a rich collection of arms used by the Tribal, Mughals, Marathas and British rulers.

=== Tribal art collection ===
The tribal art gallery showcases objects used by tribal communities like boomerangs, tobacco boxes, tools, musical instruments etc.

=== Painting collection ===
The Nagpur Central Museum also has an art gallery, which houses some unique paintings from the Bombay School of Art.

== Museum library ==
The museum houses a reference library with rare ancient inscriptions, manuscripts, books and publications.

== Museum highlights ==
- Dinosaurs’ fossils excavated from the Central India region
- A huge skull of a per-historic elephant
- Old photographs of historic buildings in Nagpur
- Statues of Queen Victoria of the United Kingdom (Removed from Vidhan Bhavan, Nagpur after independence)

== Gallery ==
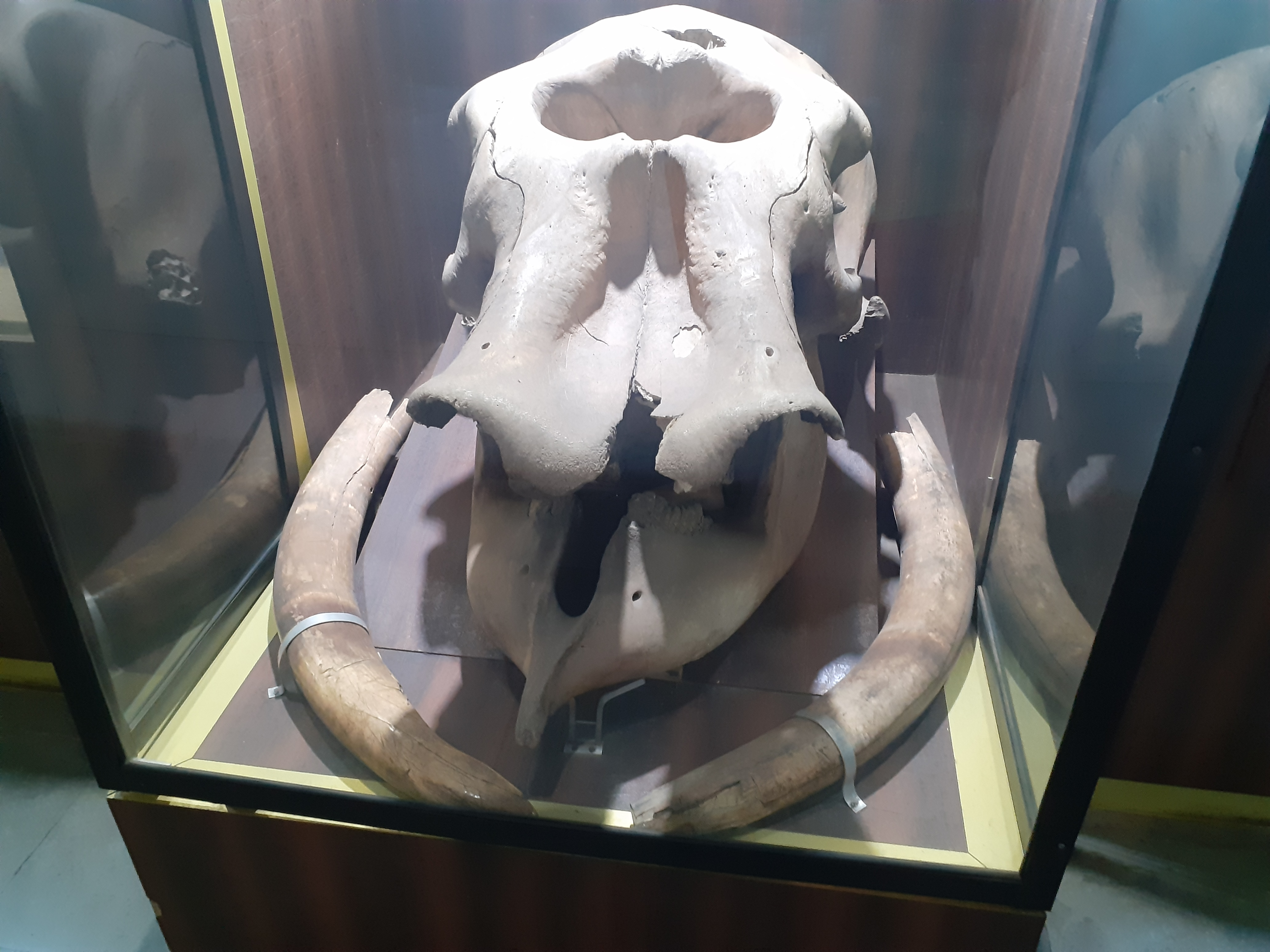
Skull of prehistoric elephant

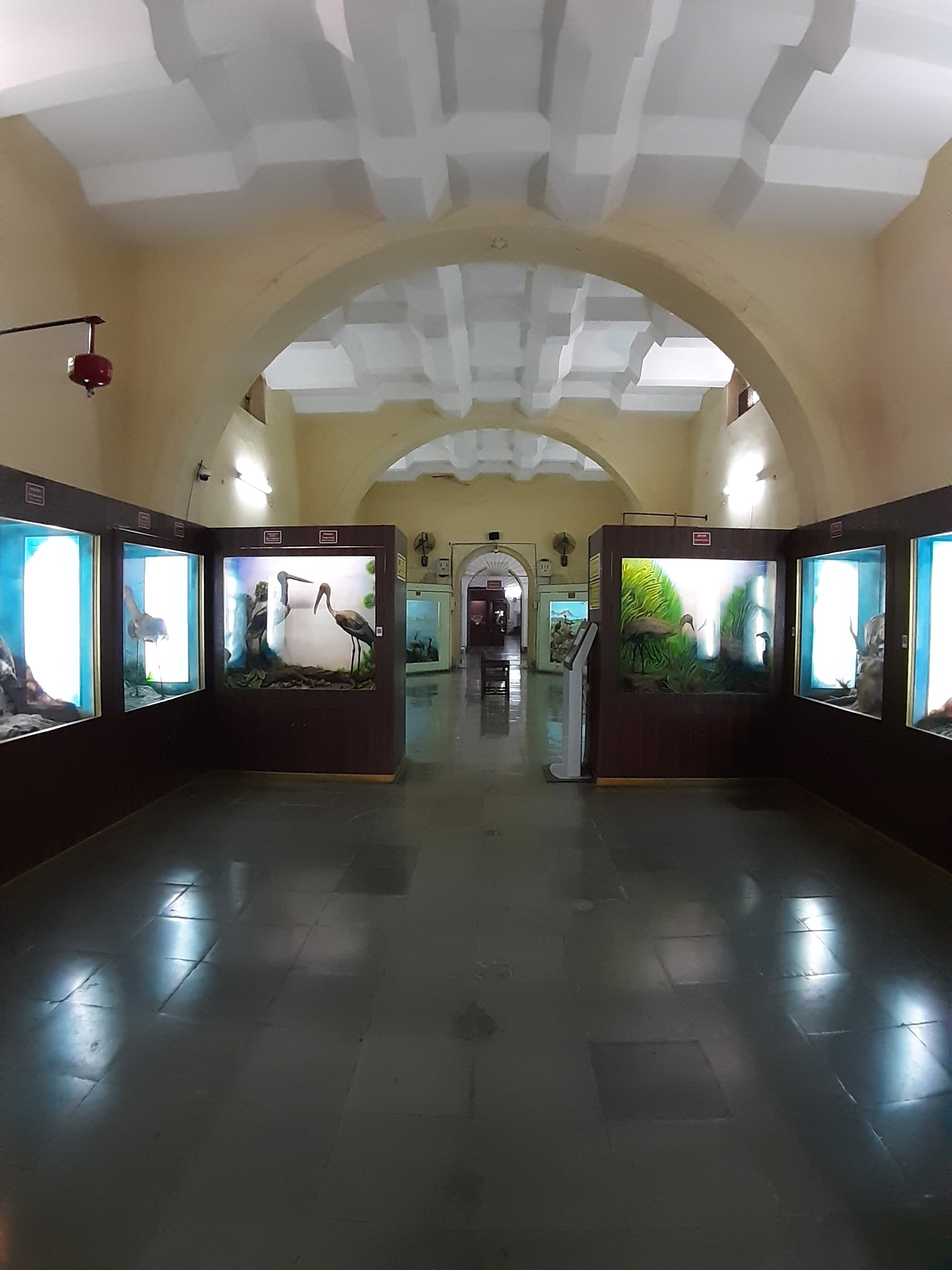
Natural history gallery

== See also ==
- Raman Science Centre, Nagpur
- List of museums in India
