= Nehru Science Centre =

Science museum in Worli, Mumbai, India

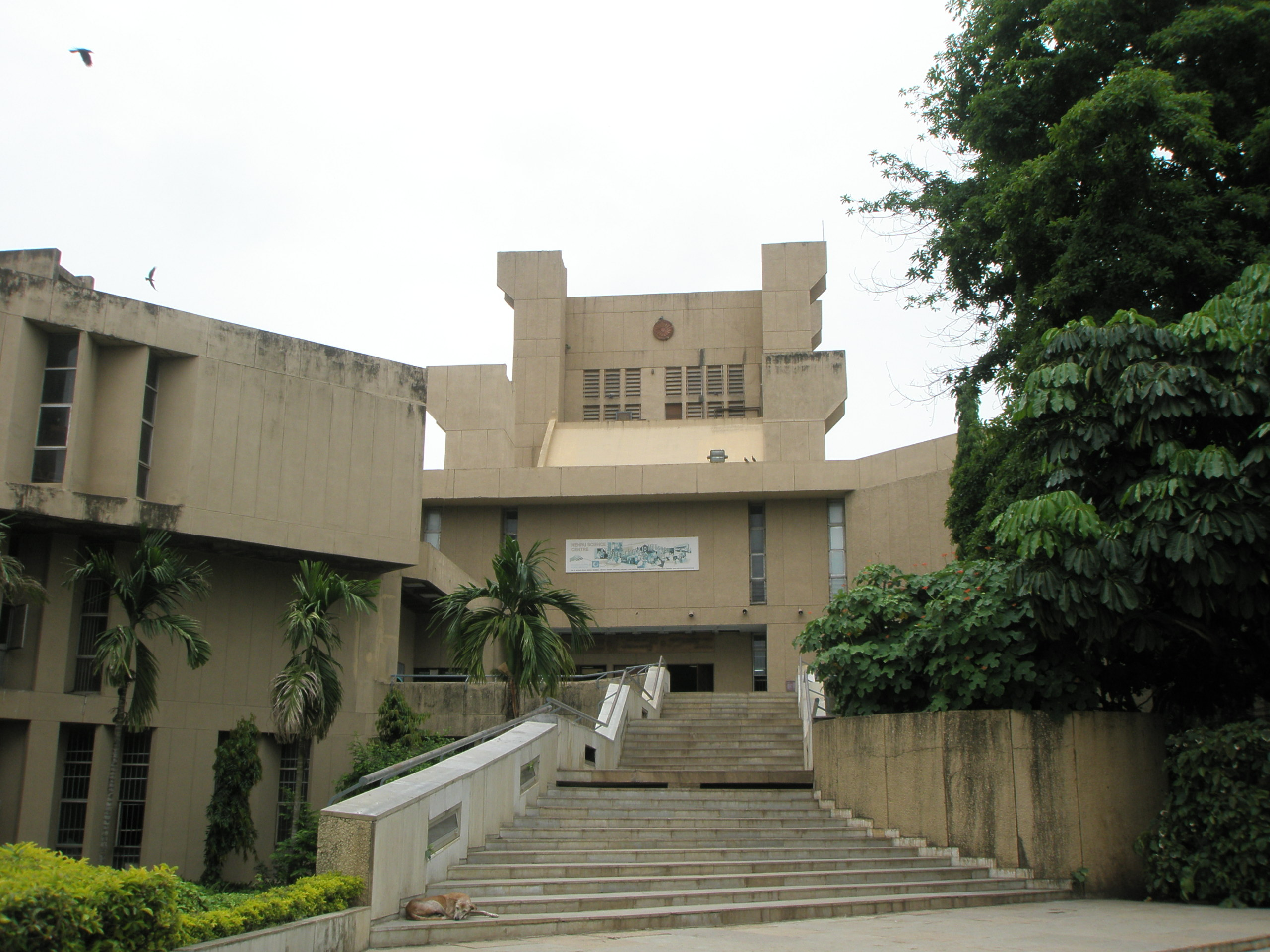
- Established: 1985
- Location: Mumbai, India
- Coordinates: 18.990633°N 72.818669°E
- Type: Science centre, Education centre
- Visitors: 2908765 [As on 31 March 2018]
- Director: Umeshkumar Rustagi
- Website: nehrusciencecentre.gov.in

Nehru Science Centre (NSC) is the largest interactive science centre in India. It is located in Worli, Mumbai. The centre is named after India's first Prime Minister, Jawaharlal Nehru. In 1977, the centre started with the 'Light and Sight' exhibition, and then in 1979 a Science Park was built. On 11 November 1985 it was opened to the public by Rajiv Gandhi, the then Prime Minister of India.

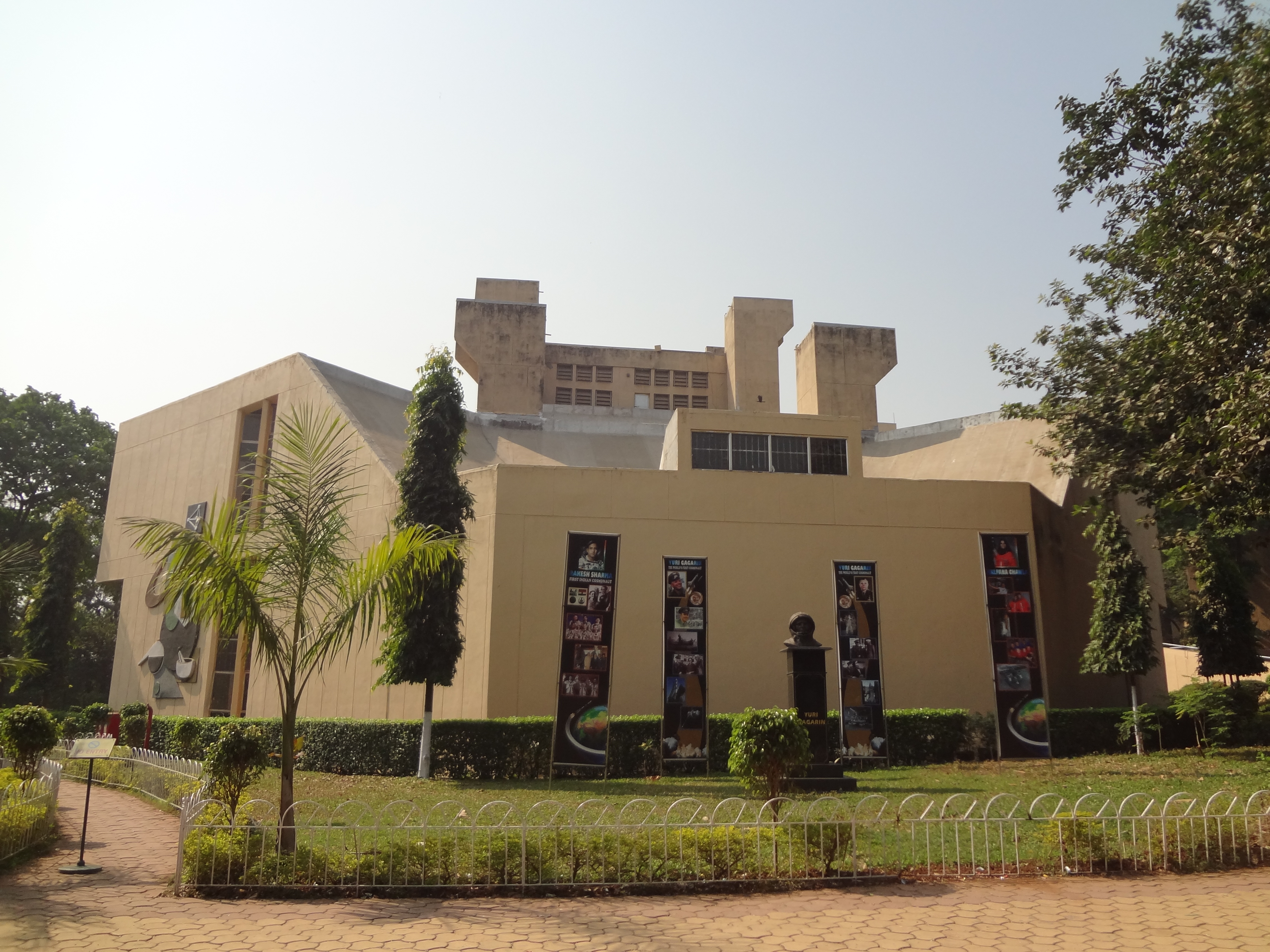
Nehru Science Centre, Worli

In 1977, Nehru Science Centre, conceived as a Science & Technology Museum in late sixties, took final shape as India's largest interactive science centre, to match world trends in such public institutions. The centre opened its first semi-permanent exhibition `Light & Sight' in 1977 followed by the world's first Science Park in 1979, during the International Year of the child. On 11 November 1985 the full-fledged science centre was finally opened to public by Prime Minister Rajiv Gandhi.

Nehru Science Centre, the largest Science Centre in the country has a sprawling 8 acres (32,000 m^{2}) of science park with varieties of plants, trees and shrubs. More than 500 hands-on and interactive science exhibits on energy, sound, kinematics, mechanics, transport, etc. are installed in the park. The NSC building, with its unique architecture, houses several permanent science expositions on various theme.

National Council of Science Museums (NCSM), the parent body of Nehru Science Centre, Mumbai, with its 25 science centres / museums all over the country, has the best infrastructure and skilled manpower to conceptualise, design, develop and organise high quality science exhibits and other related educational programmes and activities.

The centre is one of the four national level science museums in NCSM, working as the Western Zone Headquarters with five science centres in Nagpur, Calicut, Bhopal, Dharampur and Goa under its umbrella, caters to the people in the Western part of India. As a part of its activities, the centre organises regular extensive science education programmes, activities and competitions for the benefit of the common people and students in particular.

Former Directors
- Amalendu Bose
- Saroj Ghose
- R M Chakrabarti
- G S Rautela
- S M Khened
- A S Manekar
- S M Khened
- Subhabrata Chaudhuri

More than 500 hands-on and interactive science exhibits are based on various aspects of science and technology, and there is a collection of some historical artefacts of science and technology. The 3D Science Show is also organised at the centre.

NSC is famous for its Distinct shape

Nehru Science Centre, conceived as a Science & Technology Museum in late 1960s, took final shape as India's largest interactive science centre in 1977 to match the world trends in such public institutions. The centre opened its first semi-permanent exhibition `Light & Sight' in 1977 followed by the world's first ever Science Park in 1979, during the International Year of the child. The full- fledged science centre was finally opened to public on 11 November 1985 by Prime Minister Rajiv Gandhi.

National Council of Science Museums (NCSM), the parent body of Nehru Science Centre, Mumbai, with its 29 Science Centres / Museums all over the country, has the best infrastructure and skilled manpower to conceptualise, design, develop and organise high quality science exhibits and other related educational programmes and activities.

== See also ==
- Swami Vivekananda Planetarium, Mangalore
- List of science centers#Asia
