= Saroj Ghose =

Indian museum founder (1935–2025)

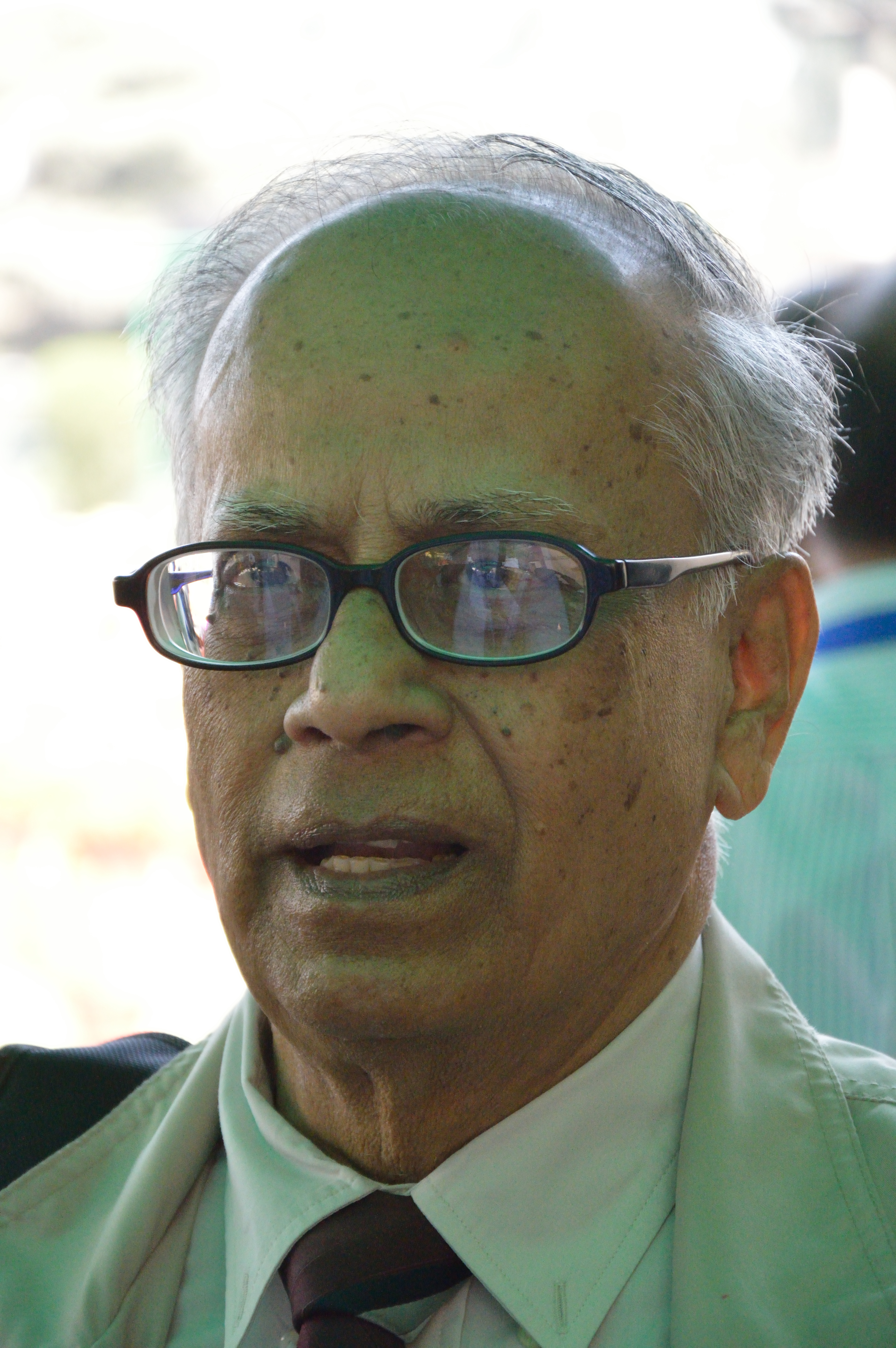
- Ghose in February 2014
- Born: 1 September 1935; Calcutta, Bengal Presidency, British India
- Died: 17 May 2025 (aged 89); Seattle, Washington, U.S.
- Employer: Retired from NCSM
- Known for: Science popularizer, Museum maker
- Notable work: Science City, Kolkata. Parliament Museum, New Delhi Rashtrapati Bhavan Museum, New Delhi, India
- Title: PhD
- Awards: Padma Shri (1989); Padma Bhushan (2007)

Saroj Ghose (1 September 1935 – 17 May 2025) was an Indian science popularizer and museum maker. He was the director of Birla Industrial & Technological Museum and director general of the National Council of Science Museums, Government of India. He was also the President of the International Council of Museums in Paris from 1992 to 1998. During his 60 years of professional experience, he received numerous national and international awards, including the Padma Bhushan and Padma Shri, the third and fourth highest civilian awards in India, respectively. He also mentored some of India's current museum developers.

Ghose died in Seattle, Washington USA on 17 May 2025, at the age of 89. Forever a man of science, he donated his body to the University of Washington Willed Body Program for medical research.

== Biography ==
Saroj Kumar Ghose, an only child, was born on 1 September 1935 in Calcutta. After matriculation in 1950, Ghose took admission in Presidency College, now Presidency University, Kolkata and then graduated with a 1st Class Honours in Electrical Communication Engineering from Jadavpur University, Kolkata in 1956.

After receiving his Bachelor of Engineering degree, Saroj Ghose joined the Birla Industrial & Technological Museum(BITM) as a Technical Officer in 1958. He left for the USA to pursue higher studies at Harvard University and received a Masters in Control Engineering in 1964. Upon his return to India, he became a Curator of BITM in 1965. In the same year, Ghose launched the first indigenously developed travelling science exhibition in India called Mobile Science Museum. It was inaugurated by the Chief Minister of West Bengal, Prafulla Chandra Sen, on 17 November 1965. However, in a year, Ghose realized the challenges associated with operating the mobile science museum so he introduced the concept of a “Museobus” which consisted of 28 exhibit cabinets mounted on a truck chassis. The Mobile Science Museum had transitioned over to what came to be known as Mobile Science Exhibition.

Between 1971 and 1974, Ghose carried out research for his PhD thesis at the Smithsonian Institution in Washington DC. He received his Ph.D. from Jadavpur University based on his research at the Smithsonian Institution on 'The Introduction and Development of the Electric Telegraph in India'. He returned to India in 1974 to BITM and in 1979 became the founding director of the National Council of Science Museums(NCSM) and remained its Director General until his retirement in 1997.

Ghose was also an active member of the International Council of Museums(ICOM), an organization that continues to represent the global museum community. From 1984-90, he was the Chair of the Indian National Committee of ICOM and from 1989–92, the Chair of the ICOM Asia-Pacific Organization. In 1992 he was elected as the President of ICOM and was re-elected in 1995 in Stavanger, Norway for another 3 years. In 2016, he was elected as an Honorary Lifetime Member of ICOM.

Ghose had 60 years of experience in museum development and science communication in India and abroad and was instrumental in the development of a large chain of 27 science museums/centers all over India, along with interactive exhibits and extensive outreach activities through mobile science exhibitions, rural development programs, creative activities for school children, school science centers, etc. He introduced a new concept of science parks and energy parks in India and abroad; organized travelling science exhibitions in USA, Russia, France, China, and Bulgaria; and developed Science City Kolkata, the first science city in India. He was responsible for exhibit development in an even larger Gujarat Science City in Ahmedabad; designed a National Science Museum for Yemen; introduced the concept of high-tech story-telling museums in India by setting up Kolkata Panorama, a speaking gallery in Nehru Museum in New Delhi, the Parliament Museum and Rashtrapati Bhavan Museum in New Delhi.

== Official Positions ==
- President (1992–98), International Council of Museums (ICOM), UNESCO Paris
- Chairman (1996–99), Science Center World Congress
- Director General (1979–97), National Council of Science Museums, India
- Director (1991–92, concurrently held), Indian Museum, Kolkata
- Director (1965–79) of the first science museum of India, the Birla Industrial & Technological Museum
- Member, Indo-US Sub Commission on Education & Culture, 1979–95
- Chairman (1989–92), ICOM Asia-Pacific Organization
- Chairman (1984–90), Indian National Committee of ICOM

== Awards and distinctions ==
- 2016 - Honorary Member, International Council of Museums
- 2012 - J.B.S. Haldane award for interaction of science and society
- 2007 – Padma Bhushan in Science and Engineering
- 2001 - National Award for S&T Popularisation among Children from Government of India
- 1998 - D.Sc. North Bengal University
- 1997 – ASTC Fellowship for lifetime achievement
- 1996 - Primo Rovis Award for scientific and technological culture from Trieste International Foundation for Scientific Progress and Freedom, Third World Science Academy in Trieste, Italy
- 1993 - Carey Memorial Award for science popularization
- 1989 – Padma Shri in Science & Engineering
- 1988 - Hari Om Ashram Trust Award from University Grants Commission for interaction of science and society
- 1987 - Indira Gandhi Prize from Indian National Science Academy for Popularisation of Science

== Adviser ==
- Gujarat Science City, Ahmedabad
- Parliament Museum, New Delhi
- Rashtrapati Bhavan Museum, New Delhi, India
- Member, Governing Body, National Council of Science Museums (NCSM)
- Chairman, Executive Council of Science City, BITM and CRTL of NCSM at Kolkata
- Chairman, Advisory Committee of National Museum of Natural History, New Delhi
- Member of the Mentor Group of Indian Museum, and Victoria Memorial at Kolkata
