= District Science Center - Tirunelveli =

District Science Center
- Established: 27 February 1987
- Location: Tirunelveli - 627 009.
- Coordinates: 10.768859°N 78.703144°E
- Website: http://www.dsctirunelveli.org.in/index.php

District Science Center - Tirunelveli, located in Tirunelveli District of Tamilnadu State, India. It is operated under National Council of Science Museums, Which is governed by Ministry of Culture, Indian Government. Which is inaugurated on 19 February 1987.

== Location ==
It is located at the center of Tirunelveli City, its location nearby the 'Thamirabarani River banks' and 'Tirunelveli District Collector Office Cambus' of Kokirakulam.

== Features ==
Now There are five galleries are opened for visitors.

- Fun Science Gallery
- Famous Science Gallery
- Electronics Gallery
- New Wings of Electronics Gallery
- Mirror Magic

== Attraction ==
- TV Studio,
- Pre Historical Park.
- Mirror Magic Gallery of this centre attracts more people.
- Digital Planetarium of this centre attracts the visitors towards the space wonder.
- Since 1988, This center runs a 'Mobile Science Exhibition' Bus to all over the Tamilnadu, which is spread the science news especially villages of the Tamilnadu.
- Mini 3D Theater : This Theater runs a show of 15 minute to 20 minute length of movie, and show time on 11am, 12Noon and evening 3, 4, 5 pm. The movie name called as 'Ring of Fire', 'Inner Space', 'Master of Magic', 'Zoo Animal', 'Shark island', 'Dio Island', 'Cat and Mouse'.

== Office hour ==
This center operates from morning 10:30 am to evening 6:30 pm. It runs throughout the year except Deepavali and Pongal festival day.

== Fare ==
	General Public	Public Groups more than 25nos	School/College	Below Poverty Line, Who have BPL card
Entrance Fee	Rs.20/-	Rs.10/-	Rs.10/-	Rs.05/-
3D Theater Fee	Rs.25/-	Rs.10/-	Rs.10/-	Rs.10/-
Digital Planetarium Fee	Rs.25/-	Rs.15/-	Rs.15/-	Rs.05/-
Science Shows Fee	Rs.15/-	Rs.10/-	Rs.10/-	Rs.05/-

== See also ==
- List of planetariums
