= National Science Centre, Delhi =

National Science Centre
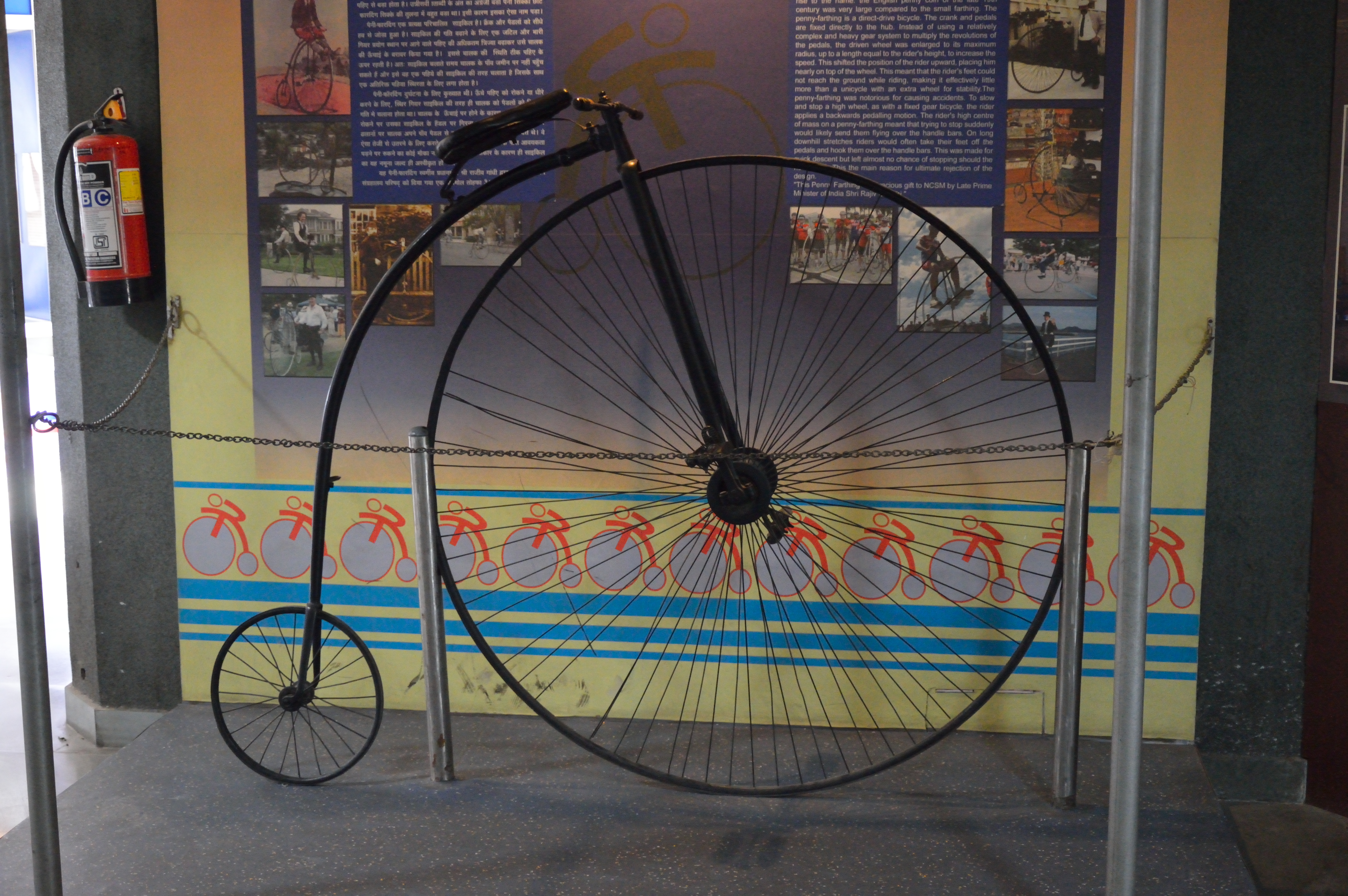
- From top: The National Science Centre; Prime Minister PV Narasimha Rao inaugurating the Centre; A penny-farthing bicycle gifted by the then Prime Minister Rajiv Gandhi
- Established: 1992
- Location: Bhairon Marg, Delhi, India
- Coordinates: 28.6132428°N 77.2453003°E
- Type: science museum
- Visitors: 968287 [As on April 2024]
- Director: Vijay Shankar Sharma
- Curators: Raj Mehrotra; Rafi Shaik
- Website: nscd.gov.in

The National Science Centre established in 1992, is a science museum in Delhi, India. It is part of the National Council of Science Museums (NCSM), an autonomous body under India's Ministry of Culture. It stands close to Gate no 1, of Bharat Mandapam overlooking the Purana Qila.

NSCD is dedicated to making science accessible through interactive exhibits.

- Thematic Gallery
- Educational Workshop
- Informative Exhibition
- Immersive Shows
- Indoor & Outdoor activities
- Safe and Accessible

== History ==
The National Science Center is the northern zonal headquarters of the National Council of Science Museums. The coming to power of Rajiv Gandhi saw a fresh impetus for science popularisation. With Kolkata, Bangalore and Mumbai already operating Science Centres, a need for a big Centre in the Nation's capital in Delhi in the north was felt, and work started in earnest in 1984. It was inaugurated on 9 January 1992 by the then Prime Minister of India, P.V.Narasimha Rao and is situated between the Gate Nos. 1 and 2 of the Pragati Maidan exhibition grounds, on the Bhairon Road, across Purana Qila, Delhi. The building was designed by noted Indian architect Achyut Kanvinde.

== Galleries ==
The museum contains seven permanent galleries. From the top floor, these are, in order: Our Science and Technology Heritage, opened in October 2009; Human Biology; the History of the Earth; Fun Science, containing a penny-farthing bicycle gifted by Rajiv Gandhi and a number of other interactive exhibits; Information Revolution; Emerging Technologies; and Water, Elixir of Life, which was opened in December 2010. On 26 August 2026, the centre opened its Prehistoric Life Gallery, featuring robotic models of extinct animals, including dinosaurs.

A 360 degree view of the Our Science and Technology Heritage gallery.

== Timeline ==
1982

Organised first National Science Seminar for school students at Vigyan Bhawan, New Delhi.

1986

Allotment of land in Pragati Maidan and taking possessions; beginning of building construction work.

Addition of giant 'Energy Ball' exhibit to the 'Energy is life' Pavillion on 14 November.

Introduction of Mobile Science Exhibition (MSE) Unit Yamuna from 4 December.

1988

Organisation of international workshop on 'Science Museums without walls: Exhibits to Go' from 5" to 7" Dec and Inauguration of the first set of 'Fun Science' exhibits by P. Shivshanker, HRD Minister.

1991

'Prakash: Story of Light' exhibition put up under the HOSTE project.

1995

Participated in Republic Day Parade with a tableau of Dinosaurs.

== Visitor Statistics ==
Month	General Visitors	Students Groups	Students Visitors in the Centre	Visitors in the centre	Visitors in outreach Programmes	Total Visitors
April 2023	39734	66	5635	45639	6157	51526
May 2023	40929	85	8573	49502	43660	92962
June 2023	72650	17	1225	73875	11484	85259
July 2023	23192	46	7637	30829	0	30829
August 2023	23943	518	142252	166195	10998	177193
September 2023	16899	450	10384	120703	0	120703
October 2023	30838	488	73510	104348	0	104348
November 2023	19061	293	31053	50114	3550	53664
December 2023	32141	485	50207	82348	0	82348
January 2024	28321	36	5374	33695	26237	59932
February 2024	16799	239	29409	46208	11524	57732
March 2024	30507	240	21184	51691	0	51691
April 2024	375014	2967	479863	854877	113410	968287

== Awards ==
- Dibner Award from Society of History of Technology (SHOT), Chicago, US
- First museum/ science centre of the country to display tableau at Republic Day Parade in 1995.
- First visual experiential museum set up at Banaras, UP.
- The Best Innovation award by Innovation Space, NSCD at Museo Expo at Science City, Kolkata in 2024.
- Received the Best Educational Pavilion Award at India International Science Festival 2025 on 9 December 2025.

== See also ==
- Swami Vivekananda Planetarium, Mangalore
- Van Vigyan Kendra (VVK) Forest Science Centres
