= Birla Industrial & Technological Museum =

Science museum in Kolkata, India

Coordinates: 22°32′4″N 88°21′49″E

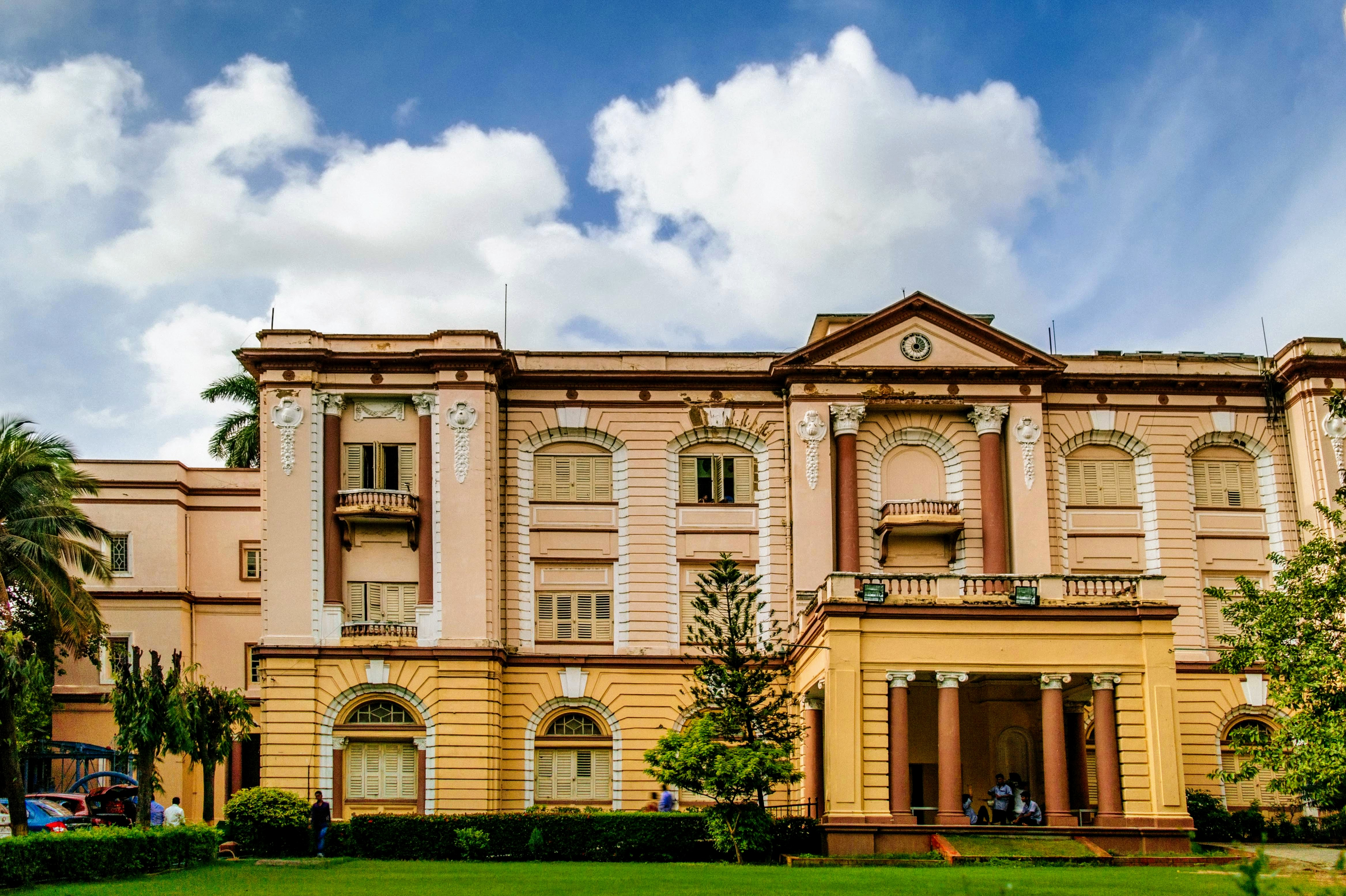
- Front of the BITM
- Location: Kolkata, India
- Type: Science; Educational
- Director: Arnab Chatterjee
- Owners: National Council of Science Museums, Ministry of Culture, Govt. of India
- Website: www.bitm.gov.in

Birla Industrial & Technological Museum (BITM) is a science museum in Kolkata, West Bengal, India. It is a unit under National Council of Science Museums (NCSM), Ministry of Culture, Government of India. Initially under the governmental jurisdiction of the Council of Scientific & Industrial Research (CSIR), BITM is commonly recognized as the precursor of India's science museum concept.

== History ==
Until 1919, the Birla Industrial & Technological Museum site, established at 19A Gurusaday Road, was initially referred to as 18 Ballygunge Store Road. In 1898, the Tagores purchased it from Mirza Abdul Karim, citing sources. For most of her early life, Meera Devi, the fourth among Rabindranath Tagore's five children, experienced childhood in this residence. G.D. Birla purchased the land from Surendranath Tagore in 1919, and it became recognized as Birla Park.

Dr. Bidhan Chandra Roy, the former Chief Minister of West Bengal felt motivated to establish a similar establishment in India for citizen participation in science and technology following a tour of the Deutsches Museum in Munich. Pandit Jawaharlal Nehru, India's prime minister and entrepreneur Shri Ghanshyam Das Birla, supported and encouraged his concept and endeavors in this area. Birla Park, his magnificent mansion and surrounding block of land in Calcutta's affluent Ballygunge neighborhood, was bequeathed to the CSIR to establish an Industrial and Technological Museum. In 1956, Pandit Nehru got this wonderful donation from Shri G. D Birla. The voyage from the government of India taking over Birla Park in 1956 to the inauguration of the Museum in 1959 was spectacular and demanding. The development of India's first scientific Museum under the aegis of the central government was the product of meticulous research and diligent work by the Museum's steering group, which was led by Dr. B. C Roy himself and included several notable scientists, educators, and entrepreneurs. Prof. Humayun Kabir, the then union minister for scientific research and cultural affairs, inaugurated the Birla Industrial & Technological Museum to the world on May 2, 1959, in the presence of Dr. B C Roy, the former Director-General of CSIR Prof. M S Thacker, and the BITM Planning Officer Shri Amalendu Bose.

The formation of BITM in 1959, and its rising prominence among the common populace, particularly the student population, contributed to the development of the National Council of Science Museums (NCSM), which currently supervises a nationwide network of science museums and science centers. The Visvesvaraya Industrial & Technological Museum (VITM) in Bangalore, which officially opened in 1965 and became the second in the CSIR network, was entrusted to the BITM team in 1964. The Planning Commission of India established a Special Unit in 1973 to examine the operations of the science museums within the purview of CSIR. It recommended a potential direction of expansion while progress on the next endeavor in Mumbai (eventually to be called Nehru Science Centre) began. The Unit considered science museums as having enormous possibilities for incorporating non-formal scientific education and instilling a scientific mindset in the country. It was advised that science museums be established across the country in a three-fold network-national, regional, and district, and that a central organization is to be established to drive this vast expansion plan and manage the operations of the science museums. As a result, the National Council of Science Museums (NCSM) was established on April 4, 1978, and the two established museums, BITM (Calcutta) and VITM (Bangalore) were separated from CSIR and placed under NCSM's authority. The NCSM network now includes 25 science museums and science centers around the country, eight of which are under the operational jurisdiction of BITM.

There were significant alterations once the Birlas acquired the property. The Tagores' home was dismantled, and architects N. Guin & Co. were commissioned to develop the significant architectural layout that visitors witness presently. It is a colonial adaption of a variety of European architectural designs. Several notable figures from the area of art, namely renowned Japanese painters Kakuzo Okakura, Yokoyama, Tikan, Hishida, and Katusta, came to see the Tagores during their reign. Revolutionary stalwarts of the era, such as Chittaranjan Das, Aurobindo Ghosh, Surendranath Banerjee, Rash Behari Ghosh, and Anandamohan Sen, were among the Tagores' guests.

While the Birlas as the new proprietors, 19A, Gurusaday Road (Birla Park) remained a unique landmark for India's independence movement as G D Birla's intimate ties with nationalist stalwarts led Mahatma Gandhi, Motilal Nehru, Lala Lajpat Rai, and Pundit Madan Mohan Malaviya to Birla Park. Chiang Kai-Shek, former President of the Republic of China, first met Mahatma Gandhi here at Birla Park.

=== Former Directors ===
Former Directors
- Amalendu Bose, 1959-1965 & 1971–1974
- Saroj Ghose, 1965-1971 & 1974–1979
- Samar Bagchi, 1979–1991
- Samaresh Goswamy, 1991–2004
- Jayanta Sthanapati, 2004–2008
- Sk. Emdadul Islam, 2008–2018
- Venkatraman Subramanian Ramachandran, 2018–2022
- Subhabrata Chaudhuri, 2022–2024
- Arnab Chatterjee, 2025-incumbent

== Existing galleries ==
Electricity, Petroleum, Nuclear Physics, Metallurgy of Iron, Steel, and Copper, Optics, Electronics, and Television were among the first exhibitions at BITM. Motive Power (1962), Communication (1963), Mining (1964), Popular Science (1965), Transport (1973), Underground Mock-up Coal Mine (1983), and Atom(1984) were among the numerous additional exhibits that sprung up as a result. However, since the public's expectations for BITM have changed, many of these old galleries have either been completely restored or replaced with modern exhibits. BITM has been providing in-museum instructional programs such as Common Seminars and Film Shows since its inception. Since 1965, Science Demonstration Lectures (SDL) for children remained a common element of BITM. BITM also launched the first-ever Mobile Science Exhibition (MSE) on wheels in the same period, with a theme of 'Our Familiar Electricity.' Since 1968, BITM has hosted a 'Science Fair' for pupils, and the first Teachers' Training Programme (TTP) was inaugurated the same year.

Creative Ability Centers (CAC), Computer Awareness Programmes, Engineering Fair, Pet Library, Inflatable Dome Planetarium Show, Public Science Shows, Students' Science Seminar, Science Drama, Vacation Hobby Camps, and numerous other in-museum and community engagement academic initiatives and events have been incorporated over the decades.

BITM presently features 15 educational and participatory Science Galleries, including a dedicated collection for the visually impaired individuals called 'A World in Darkness.' BITM hosts a variety of educational activities all year round and frequently hosts extremely engaging scientific exhibitions and experiments.

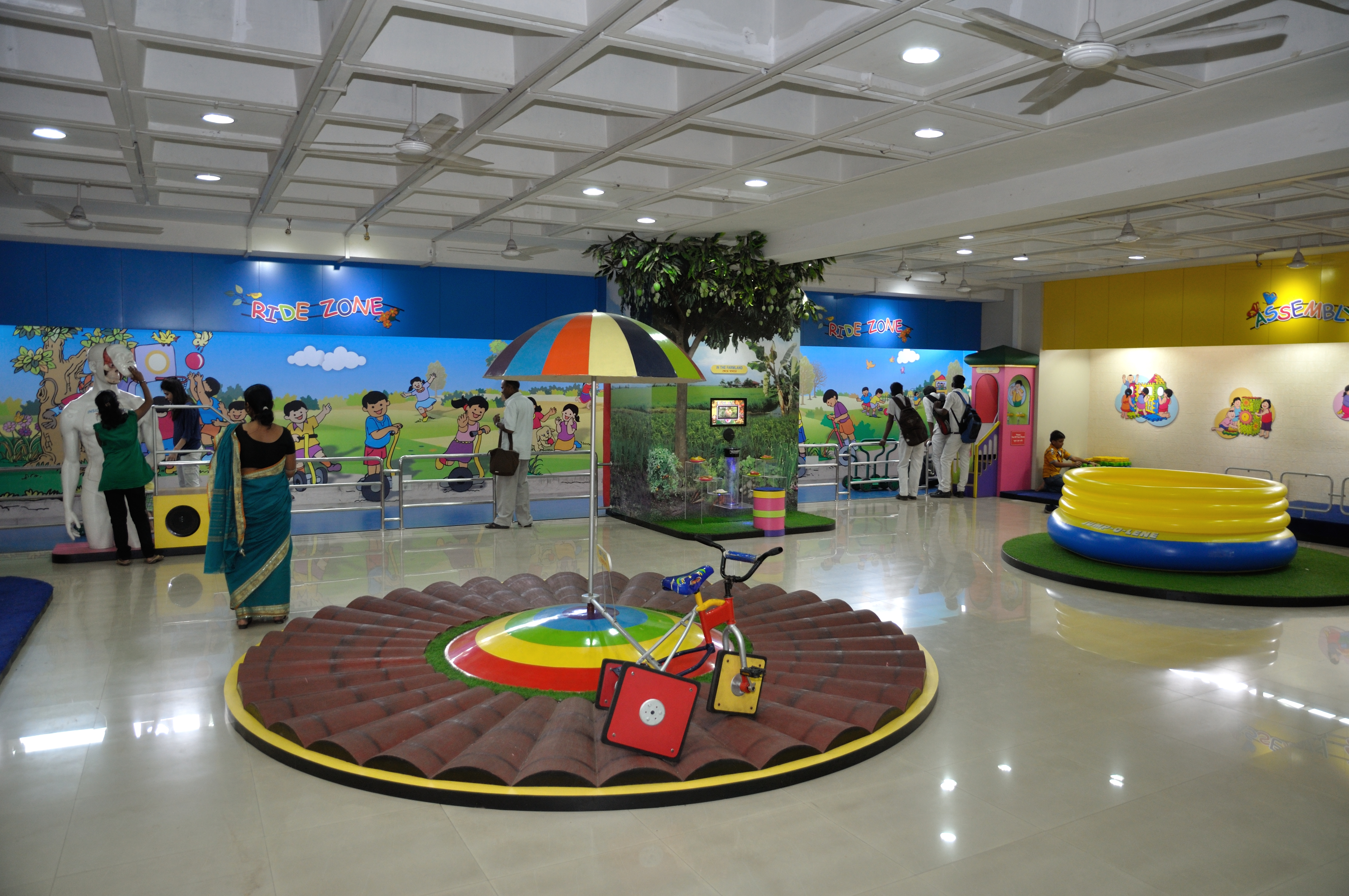
The Children's Gallery (April 2013.)

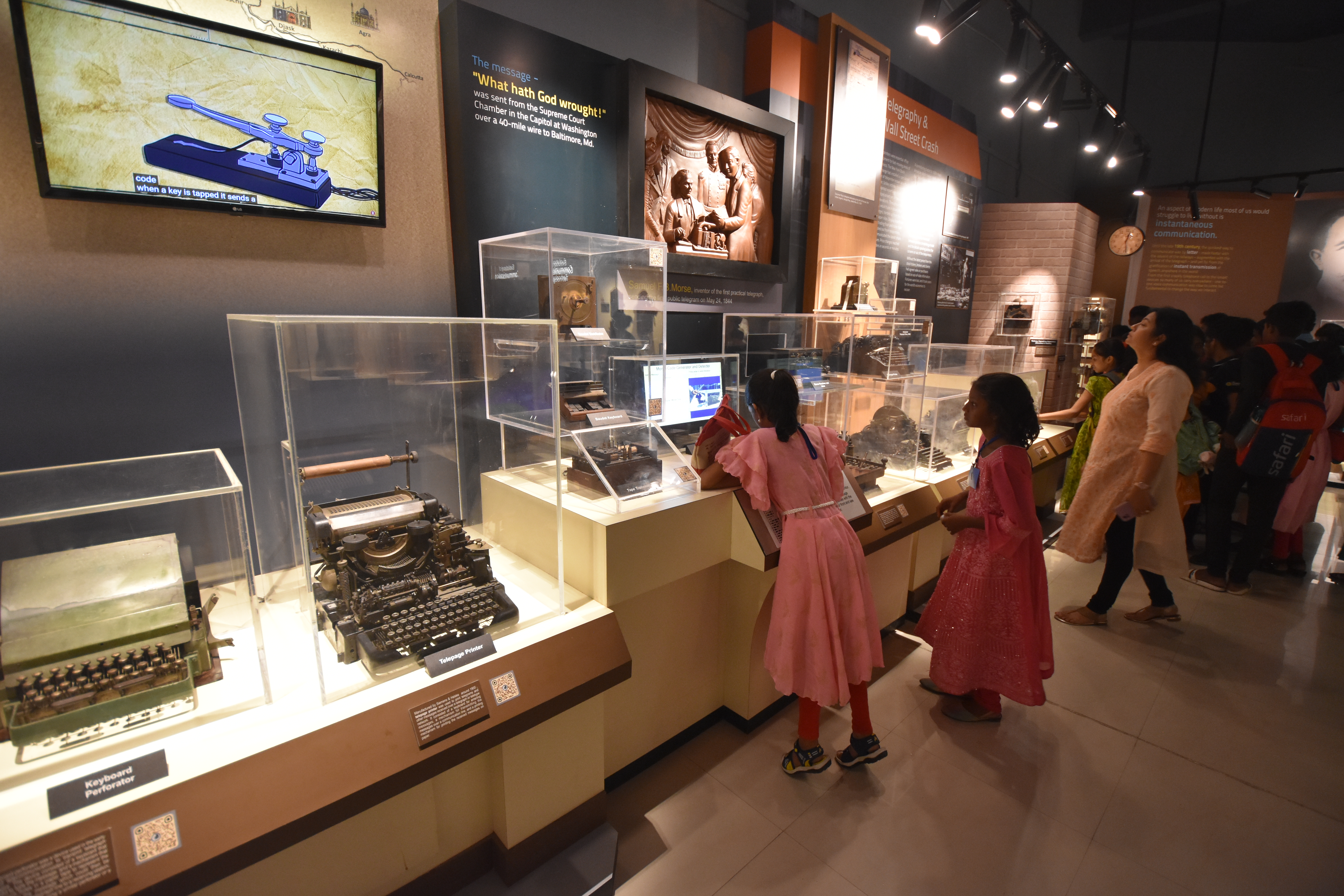
Vintage Voyage - the Communication Technology Gallery (May 2023.)

- A World in Darkness
- Vintage Voyage - Communication Technology. Inaugurated on 18 May 2023
- Children's Gallery. Inaugurated on 14 November 2012
- Electricity
- Fascinating Physics
- Digital Adventure
- Mathematics
- Metals
- Mock-up Coal Mine
- Motive Power - I & II
- Popular Science
- Television
- Transport
- Lost at Sea - Inaugurated in two phases, on 18 May & 14 November 2025

The Birla Industrial and Technological Museum (BITM) in Kolkata has a fascinating gallery called Popular Science. This gallery is designed to make science fun and interactive. It features exhibits like the Radio Bucket, Video Racing, Momentum Multiplier, Strength of Air Pressure, and Obedient Ball12. These exhibits help visitors understand basic science concepts through hands-on activities and demonstrations.

== Regular activities ==
- 3D Film Show, 'Fly Me to the Moon'
- Underground Mock-up Coal Mine Show
- Science Shows on Surprising Chemical Reactions, Science Magic & Miracle, Fun Science and Bubbles Show
- Sky observation
- Taramandal (Inflatable-dome Planetarium)

== See also ==
- Swami Vivekananda Planetarium, Mangalore
