= Regional Science Centre, Bhopal =

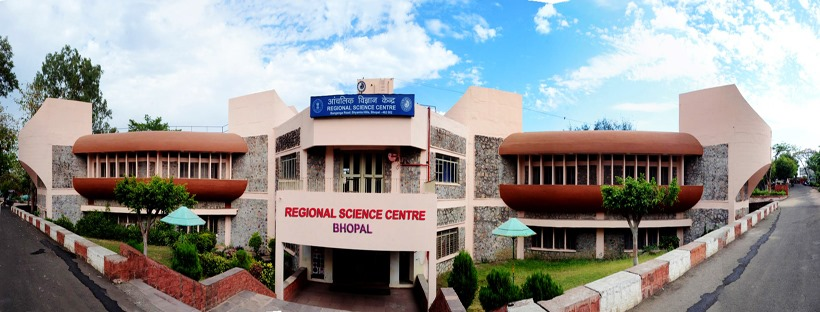

- Location of the Regional Science Centre in Bhopal, India
- Established: 12 January 1995
- Location: Banganga Road, Shyamla Hills, Bhopal - 462 002
- Coordinates: 23.259933°N 77.412615°E
- Type: Science Museum
- Visitors: 1,79,000 (April 2013-March 2014)
- Director: Saket Singh Kaurav (Project Coordinator)
- Owners: National Council of Science Museums, Ministry of Culture, Government of India
- Website: rscbhopal.gov.in

The Regional Science Centre, Bhopal (RSCB) is located in the Shyamla Hills area of Bhopal, India. It is aimed at popularizing science and technology among the people, particularly the students. It is one of the constituent units of the National Council of Science Museums or NCSM. RSCB was inaugurated on 12 January 1995 by the then president of India Shankar Dayal Sharma.

The Centre has been functioning in Bhopal since 1995 with the primary objective of popularization of Science & Technology, inculcation of scientific temper, and encouraging attitude of curiosity among the public in general and the students in particular. The Centre is the only Science Centre in the state of Madhya Pradesh (a central state of India). The Centre is visited by the general public and a large number of school & college students.

== Exhibits and facilities ==
The Centre has over 266 science exhibits spanning across a wide range of scientific disciplines. Most of the exhibits are interactive. The 5-acre RSCB campus includes a 3-acre Science Park, which contains over 60 exhibits such as pulley demonstrations, a windmill and solar-powered devices. The campus also houses a small Dinosaur Park and a zoo.

The Centre has a 200-seater auditorium and a 25-seater conference hall (both air conditioned). These are also available to the external groups for organizing relevant events, at a small charge. There is also a 50-seater AC hall, where the 3D Science Show is organised. RSCB has a small portable planetarium with an inflatable dome, with a capacity of 25 people.

RSCB also has a Mobile Science Exhibition bus with 24 exhibits. This bus goes to the small towns and remote villages of Madhya Pradesh and Chhattisgarh for creating scientific awareness through anti-superstition demonstrations, science-related films, sky observation and educational lectures.

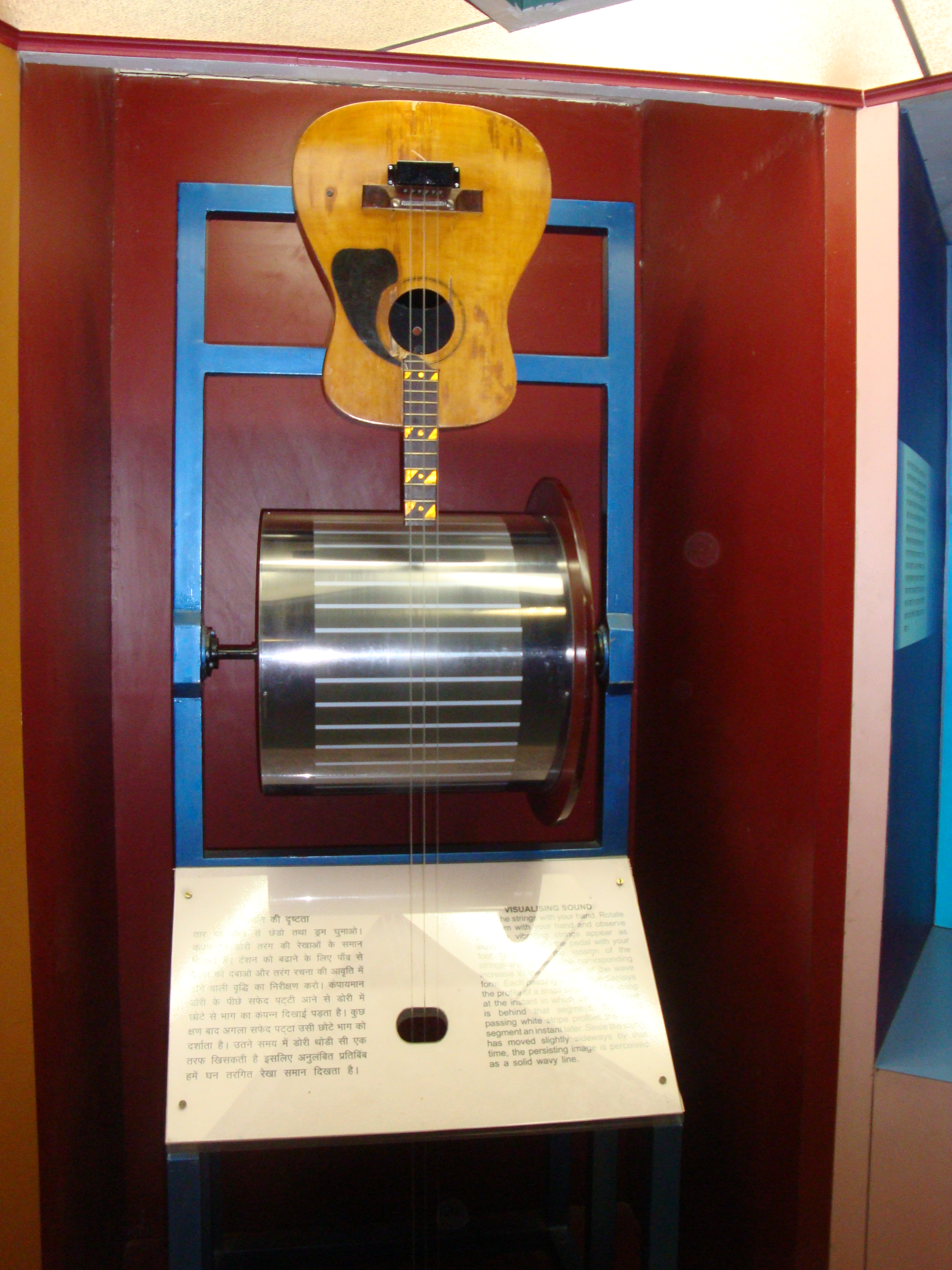
Visualizing Sound with a Guitar

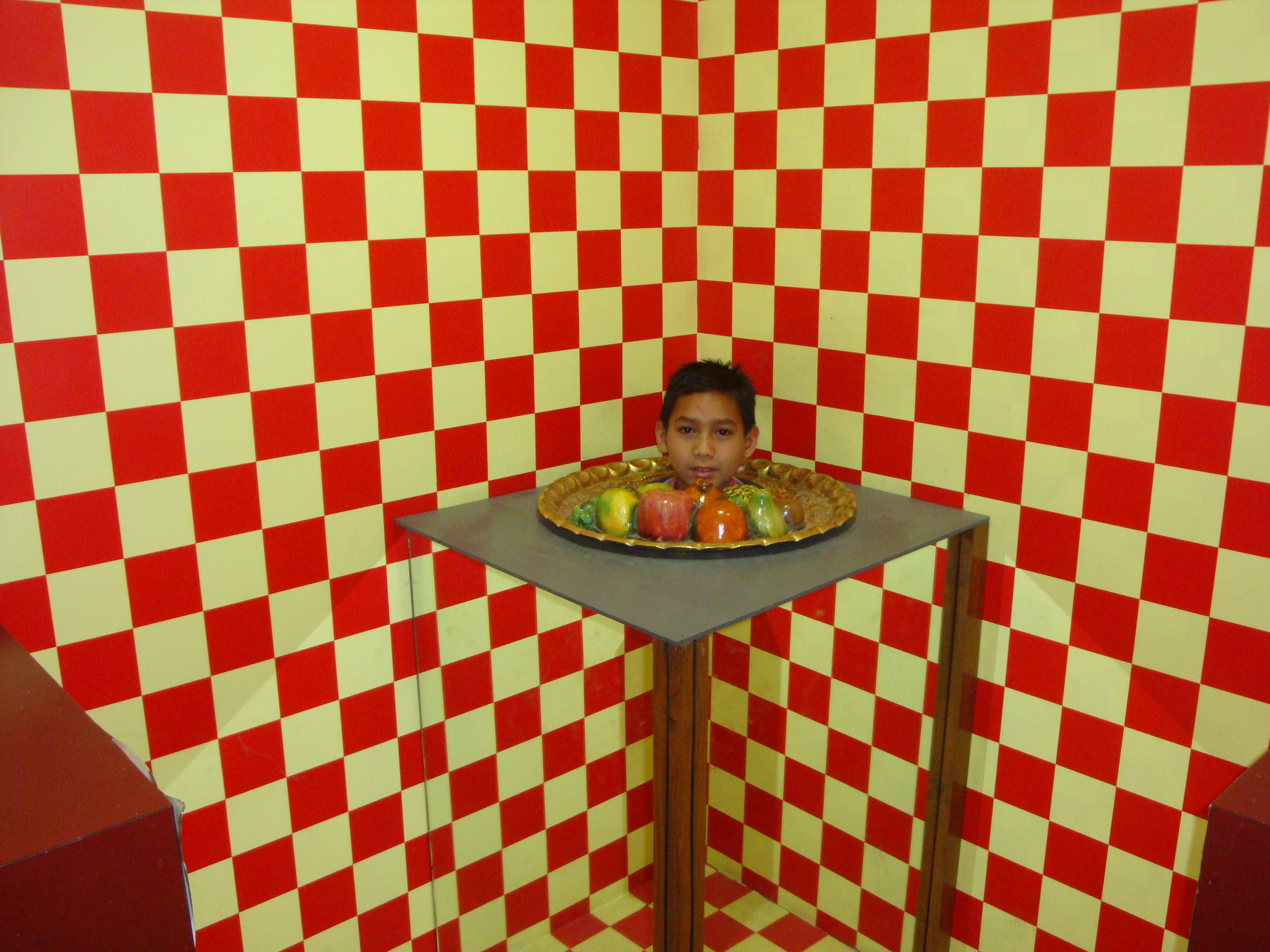
"Head on a Platter" exhibit

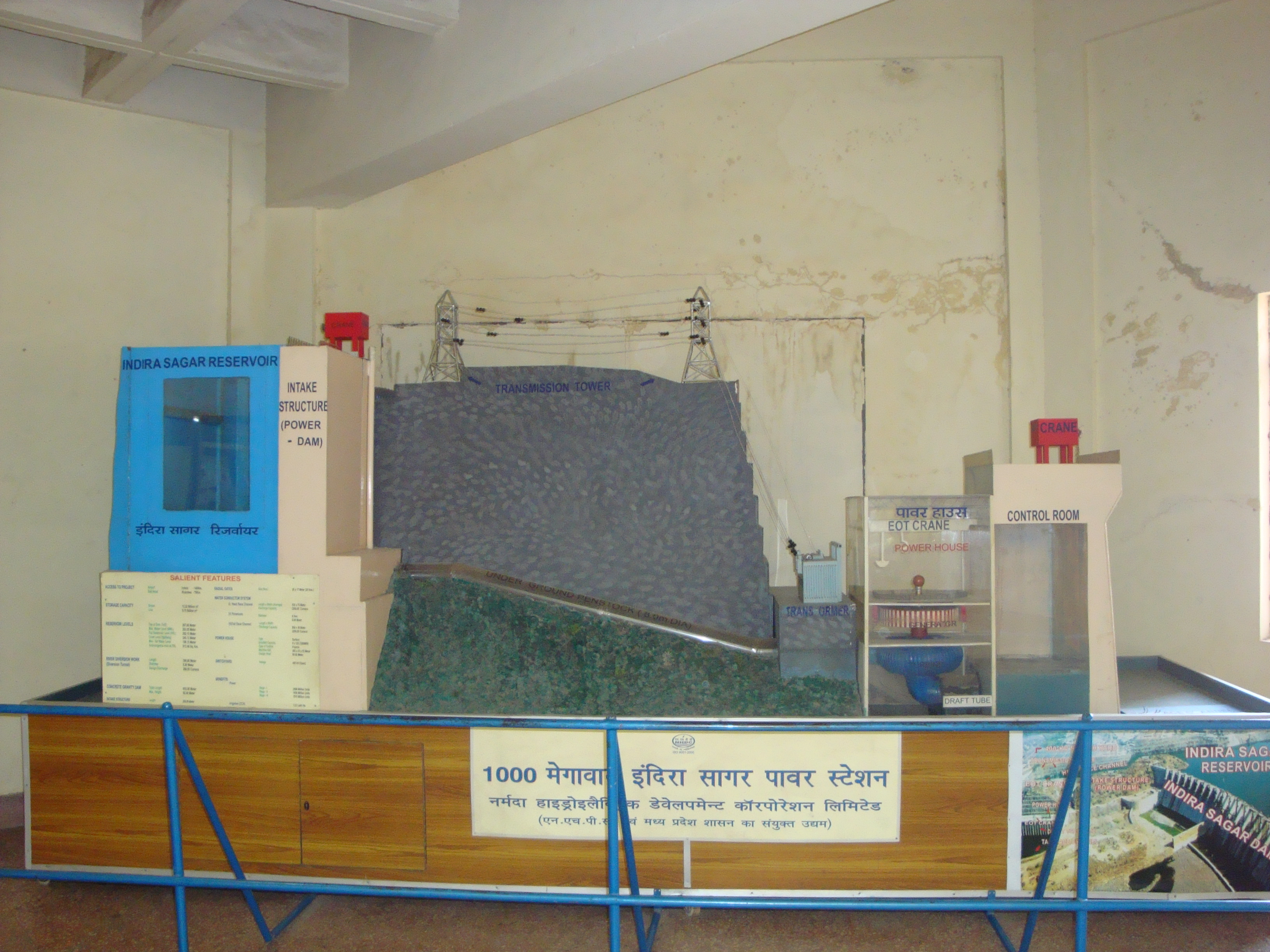
A model of the Indira Sagar Power Station

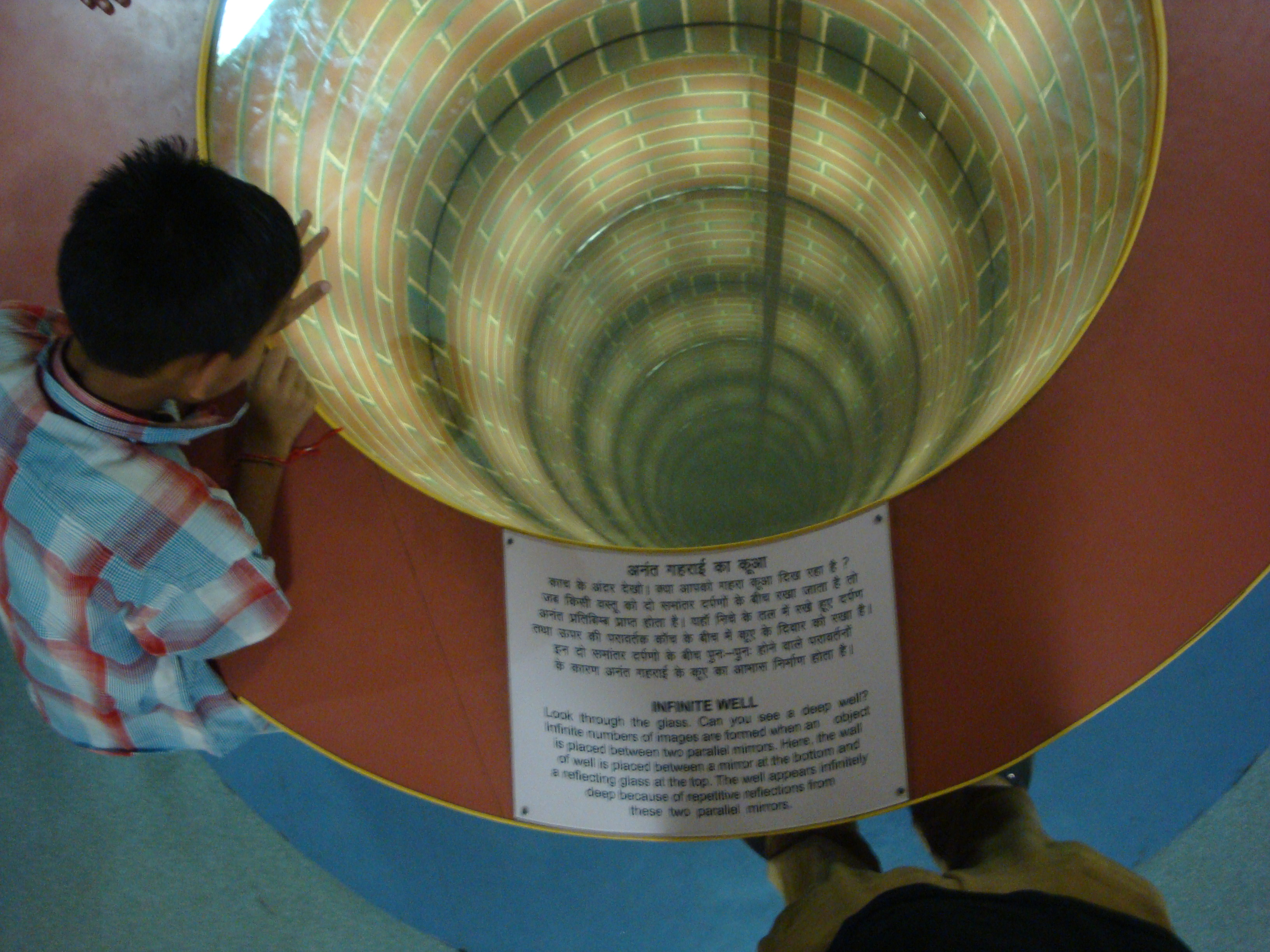
The "Infinite well" exhibit

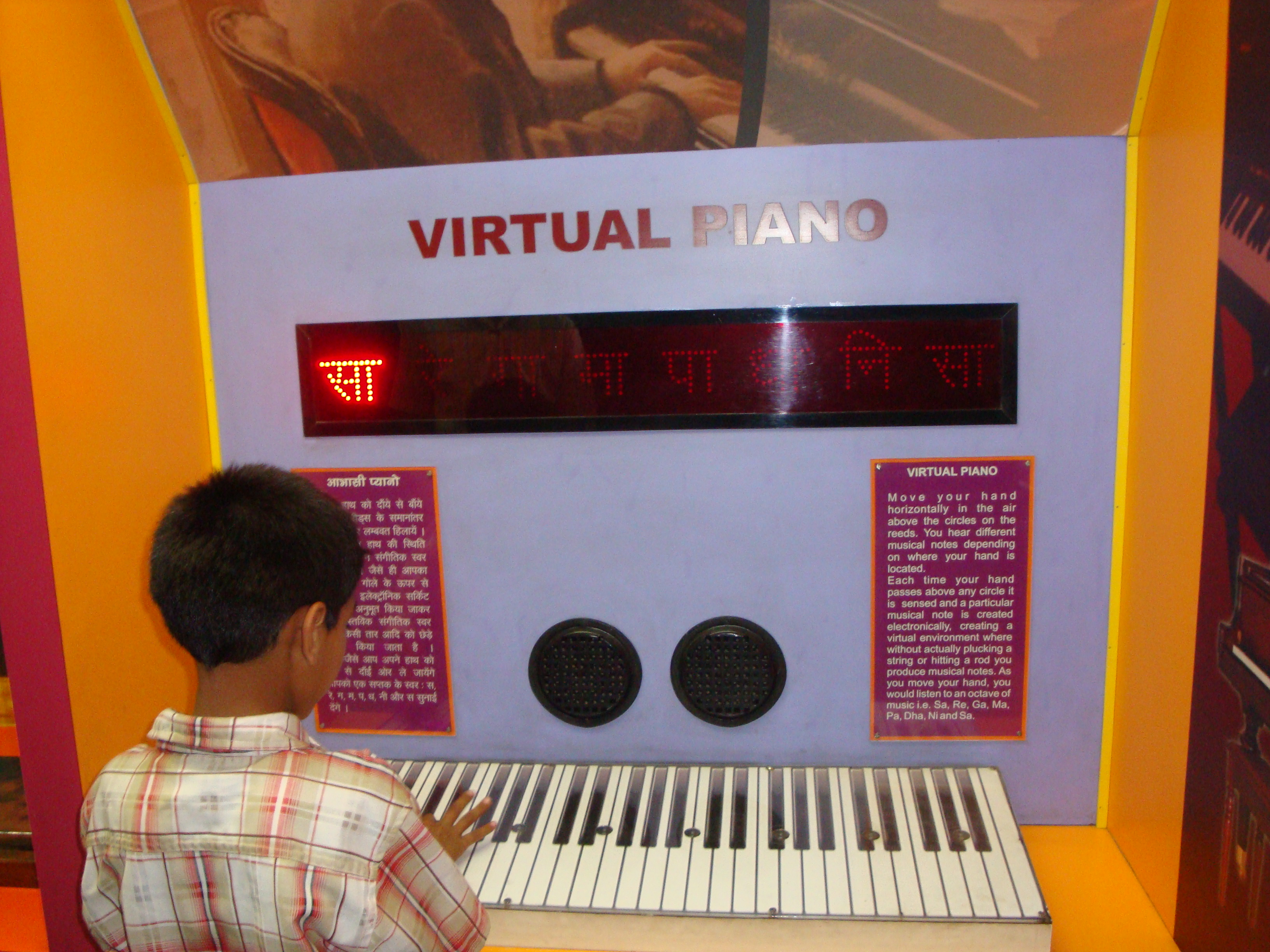
Virtual piano

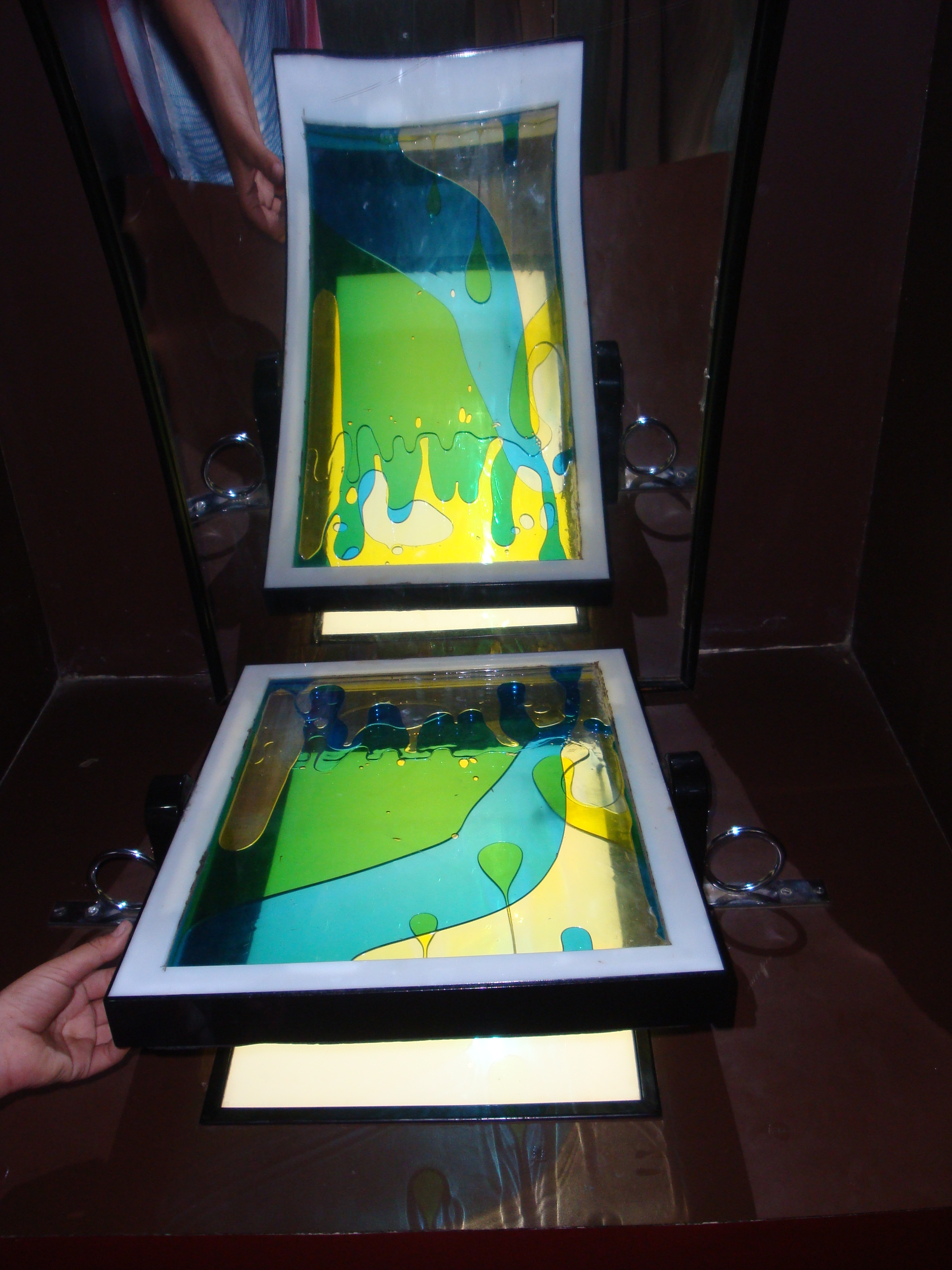
The "Paint your painting in different ways" exhibit

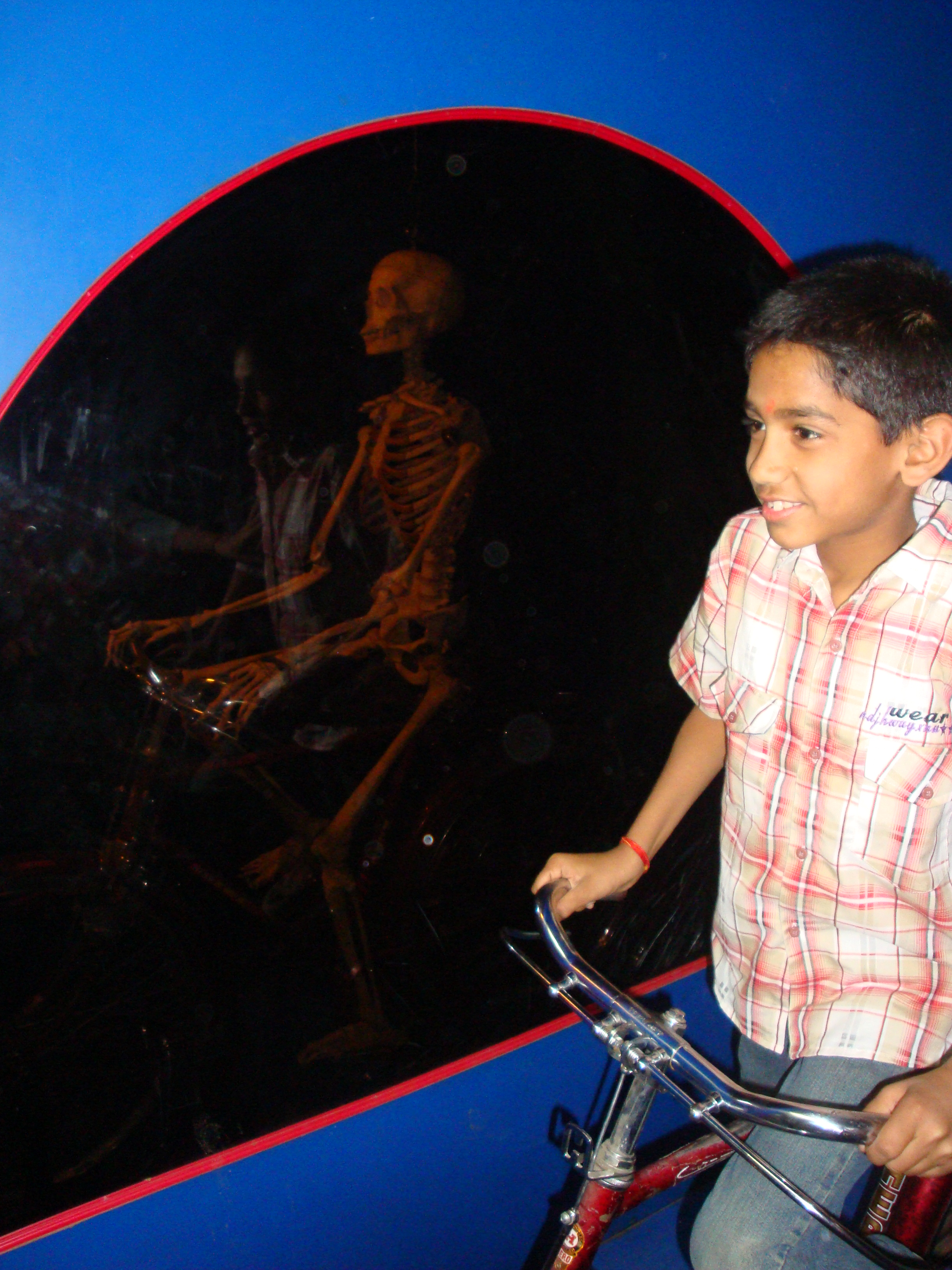
Moving skeleton of a bicyclist

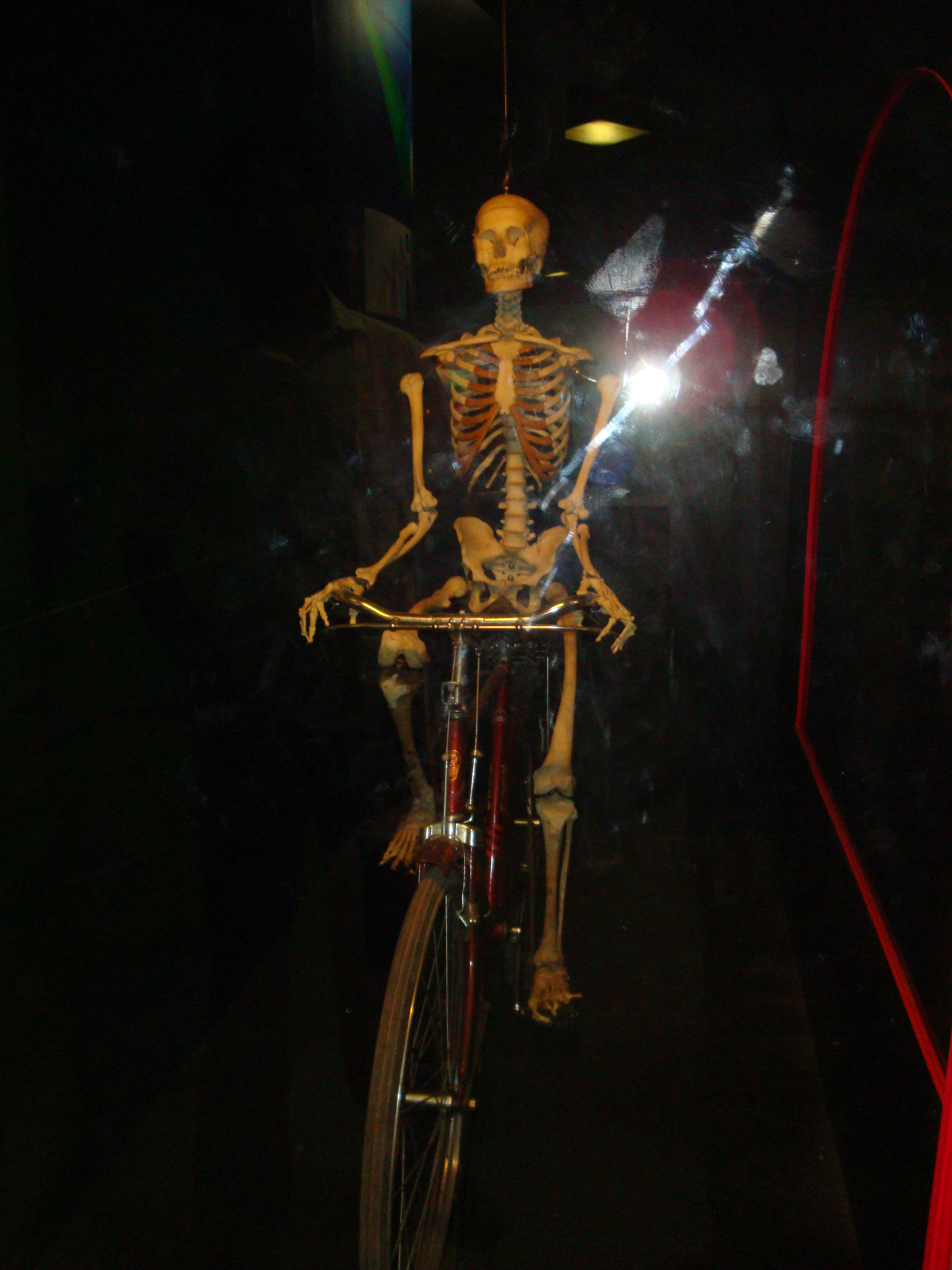
Moving skeleton of a bicyclist

== Events ==
A sky observation programme is organized on weekends after the sunset, as well as for specific astronomical events which occur from time to time. Awareness programs and exhibitions are organized on special days such as the International Museum Day and the No Tobacco Day. Student exhibits and science fairs are also organized from time to time.

Special lectures by scientists and professors are organized in celebration of commemorative days. Contests for students, film shows, awareness programmes, drama festivals, workshops and special exhibitions are also held to celebrate these days. Multi-day workshops are held for students during the summer vacations.

RSCB also organizes a one-week training programme for teachers and the would-be teachers on fabrication of simple, low-cost teaching aids. Science demonstration lectures are organized on request by school groups. RSCB offers memberships to individuals, families, schools and other institutions: the members can participate in the various activities and programmes organized by the Centre.

== See also ==
- Regional Science Centre, Chalakudy
