= Raman Science Centre =

Science museum in Nagpur, India

Raman Science Centre and Planetarium
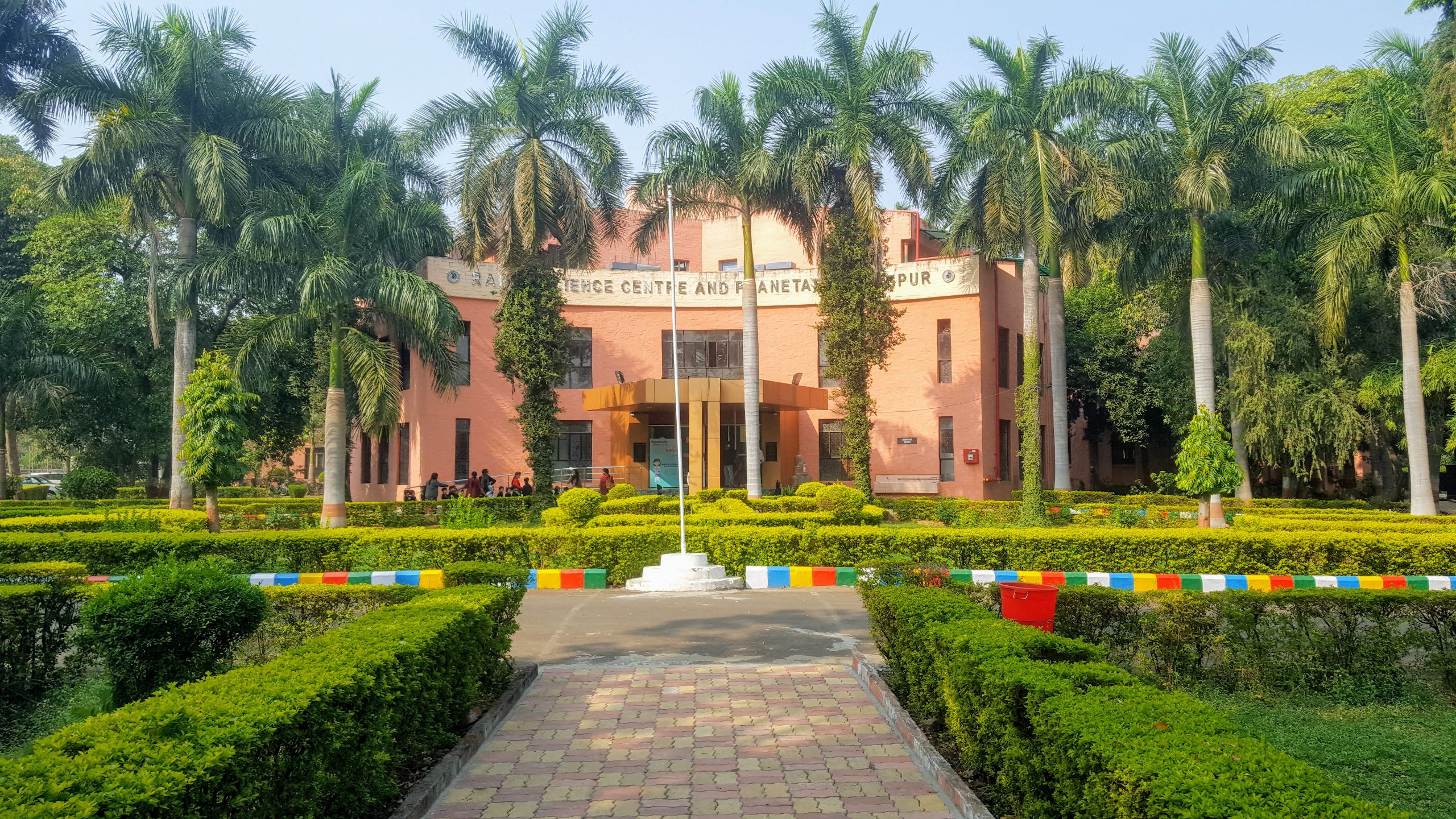
- Front view of the Raman Science Centre building at Nagpur
- Established: 1992
- Location: Nagpur
- Coordinates: 21.1459°N 79.0941°E
- Visitors: 14,440,963 (approx.)(till date)
- Website: Website

The Raman Science Centre and Raman Planetarium Complex at Nagpur is an interactive science centre affiliated with Mumbai's Nehru Science Centre. The centre was developed to promote a scientific attitude, portray the growth of science and technology and their applications in industry and human welfare, and hold science exhibits. The centre is named after famous Nobel Prize winner Indian physicist Chandrasekhara Venkata Raman.

The Raman Science Centre was inaugurated on 7 March 1992 and the planetarium was started on 5 January 1997. The centre is located opposite Gandhi Sagar Lake in the heart of Nagpur. Between 1 April 2014 and 31 March 2015, the Centre recorded a visitor count of 582,962. The centre is part of the National Council of Science Museums (NCSM), India, which is the largest network of science centres/museums under a single administrative umbrella in the world. NCSM rates the centre as regional level and it has a total floor area of 4333 sq meters.

== Activities ==
The centre carries out numerous programs to spread science and technology knowledge amongst the general public. The centre inaugurated the Innovation Centre on 14 February 2017 to give opportunities to students who are dedicated to science. The centre, along with local NGO Hirwai, gives the Green Finger Award to create awareness about the environment amongst school children. In August 2007, the information and communication technology gallery was opened, where then ISRO Chairman Madhavan Nair declared that India would send astronauts to space by 2015.

The centre currently has four different interactive galleries, an Innovation Centre, a Science on a Sphere Show and a 133-seat planetarium, two fun science galleries, a prehistoric Animal Park and more. The centre also holds science lectures, science film shows and 3-dimensional science shows. The centre also organises activities like planet watching and watching other celestial phenomena for citizens.

== See also ==
- List of science centers#Asia
