= National Council of Science Museums =

Indian governmental organization

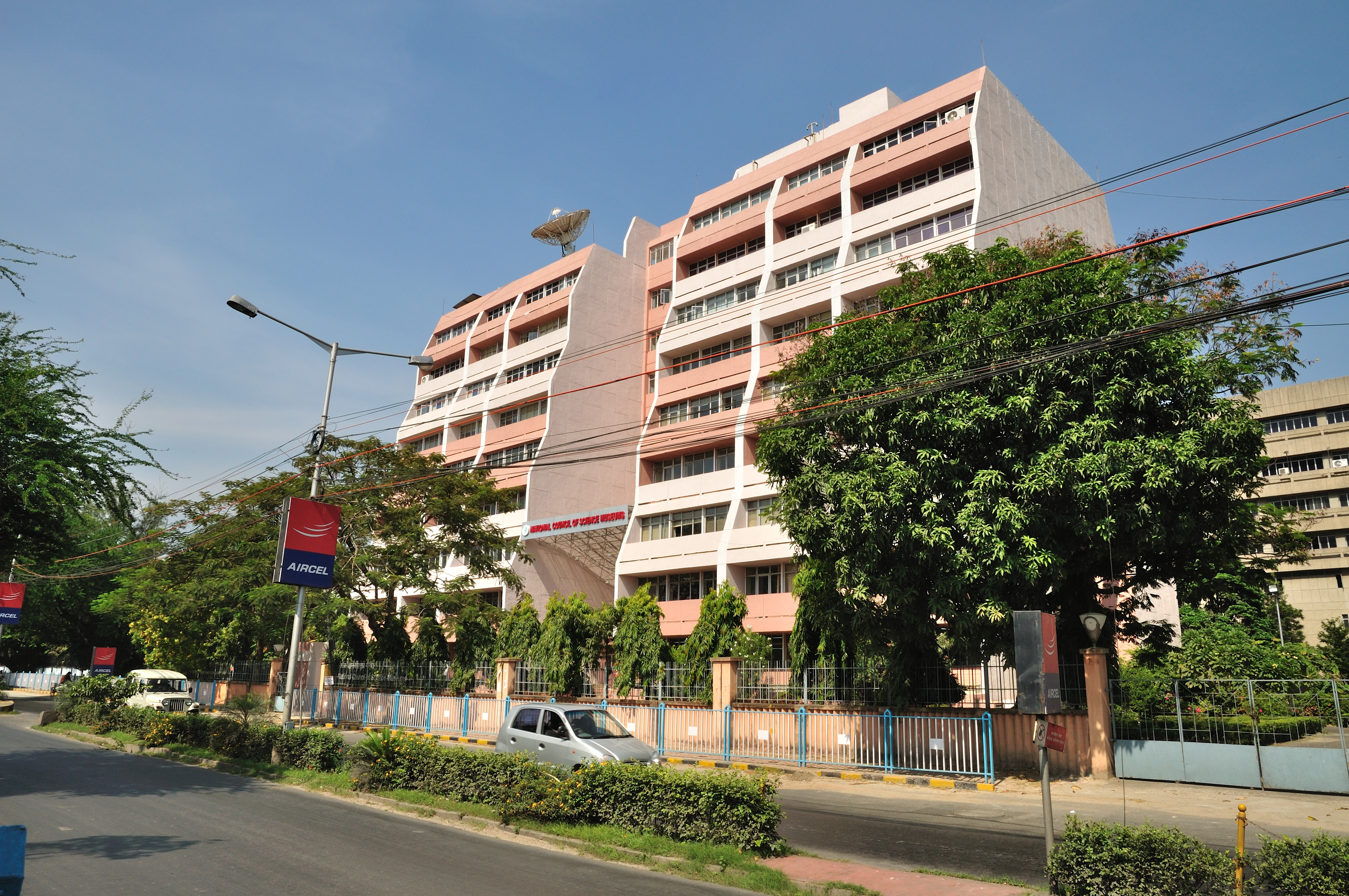
- NCSM building
- Abbreviation: NCSM
- Formation: 4 April 1978; 48 years ago
- Type: Society
- Legal status: Government
- Purpose: Educational
- Headquarters: Kolkata, West Bengal
- Location: India
- Coordinates: 22°34′12″N 88°25′43″E
- Region served: Worldwide
- Director General: Arijit Dutta Choudhury
- Parent organisation: Ministry of Culture, Govt. of India
- Affiliations: Jawaharlal Nehru University
- Budget: ₹740 crore (US$78 million) (2020–21)
- Staff: 852 (as of 31 March 2019)
- Website: ncsm.gov.in
- Remarks: Visitors 14409555 (as of 31 March 2019)

National Council of Science Museums (NCSM) is an autonomous scientific organization functioning under the Ministry of Culture, Government of India for science communication through its network of science museums or science centres spread across India. It is the largest chain of science centers/museums under a single administrative umbrella in the world. There are 24 own science centers or museums and one R & D laboratory and training centre. The NCSM has been built to co-ordinate all informal science communication activities in the museum space in the country.

== History ==
The first science museum, Birla Industrial and Technological Museum (BITM), Kolkata under CSIR43, was opened on 2 May 1959. In July 1965, the second science museum of the country, the Visvesvaraya Industrial & Technological Museum (VITM) was opened in Bangalore. After Kolkata and Bangalore, the work for the third centre in Mumbai was taken up in 1974. As the popularisation of science and technology through the science museums grew in scope and size, the Union Planning Commission constituted a task force in the early 1970s to assess the activities of the science museums. The task force recommended to set up science museums in different parts of the country at national, state and district levels and also recommended formation of a central coordinating agency. In 1978, it was decided by the Government of India to delink from CSIR the two science museums already operating at Kolkata and Bangalore and also the one being set up at Mumbai and put them under a newly formed society registered on 4 April 1978, as National Council of Science Museums (NCSM).

== List of centres ==
=== National Level Centres ===
- Science City, Kolkata, fully operational since 1 July 1997
- Science City, Guwahati, Inaugurated on 10 March 2026
- Birla Industrial & Technological Museum, Kolkata, inaugurated on 2 May 1959
- Nehru Science Centre, Mumbai, inaugurated on 11 November 1985
- Visvesvaraya Industrial and Technological Museum, Bengaluru, operational since 1965
- National Science Centre, Delhi, inaugurated on 9 January 1992
- Central Research and Training Laboratory, Kolkata, R & D laboratory and training centre of NCSM. Operational since 1 January 1988 and dedicated to the nation on 13 March 1993
- National Science Centre, Guwahati, inaugurated on 15 March 1994.

=== Satellite Units ===
- Bardhaman Science Centre, Babur Bagh, inaugurated on 9 January 1994
- Digha Science Centre & National Science Camp, West Bengal, inaugurated on 31 August 1997
- Dhenkanal Science Centre, Odisha, inaugurated on 5 June 1995
- District Science Centre, Purulia, inaugurated on 15 December 1982
- Kapilas Science Park, Dhenkanal, inaugurated on 5 June 1995
- North Bengal Science Centre, Matigara, inaugurated on 17 August 1997
- Regional Science Centre, Bhubaneswar, inaugurated on 18 September 1989
- Srikrishna Science Centre, Patna, inaugurated on 14 April 1978
- North Bengal Science Centre, Siliguri, inaugurated on 17 August 1997
- Regional Science Centre, Guwahati, inaugurated on 15 March 1994
- Regional Science City, Lucknow, operational since 1989
- Kurukshetra Panorama & Science Centre, Haryana, operational since 2000
- District Science Centre, Dharampur, operational since 1984
- Goa Science Centre, Panjim, operational since 2002
- Raman Science Centre & Planetarium, Nagpur, operational since 1992 & 1996 respectively
- Regional Science Centre, Bhopal, operational since 1995
- District Science Centre, Kalaburagi, operational since 1984
- District Science Centre, Tirunelveli, operational since 1987
- Regional Science Centre, Tirupati, operational since 1993
- Regional Science Centre and Planetarium, Kozhikode, operational since 1997
- Science Centre Port Blair, operational since 2003

== Centres developed for states/UTs ==
The following are the list of science centres/museums developed by NCSM for various state governments and union territories across India.

Science museums/centres	State/UT	Date of inauguration
Regional Science Centre, Bhopal	Madhya Pradesh	12 January 1995
Science Centre, Port Blair	Andaman and Nicobar Islands	30 May 2003
Mizoram Science Centre, Aizawl	Mizoram	26 July 2003
Nagaland Science Centre, Dimapur	Nagaland	14 September 2004
Manipur Science Centre	Manipur	18 May 2005
Arunachal Pradesh Science Centre, Itanagar	Arunachal Pradesh	3 December 2005
Shillong Science Centre, Shillong	Meghalaya	27 February 2006
Sikkim Science Centre, Gangtok	Sikkim	22 February 2008
Sub-Regional Science Centres, Kalimpong	West Bengal	2 October 2008
Sub-Regional Science Centre, Solapur	Maharashtra	14 February 2010
Regional Science Centre, Ranchi	Jharkhand	29 November 2010
Dharwad Regional Science Centre	Karnataka	27 February 2012
Chhattisgarh Science Centre, Raipur	Chhattisgarh	13 July 2012
Regional Science Centre, Jaipur	Rajasthan	29 December 2012
Pimpri Chinchwad Science Centre, Pune	Maharashtra	8 February 2013
Jorhat Science Centre & Planetarium	Assam	6 July 2013
Regional Science Centre, Coimbatore	Tamil Nadu	6 May 2013.
Sub Regional Science Centre, Jodhpur	Rajasthan	17 August 2013
Regional Science Centre, Pilikula	Karnataka	1 October 2014
Sub Regional Science Centre	Puducherry	3 May 2015
Regional Science Centre, Dehradun	Uttarakhand	3 February 2016
Bargarh Science Centre, Bargarh	Odisha	21 January 2020
Regional Science Centre, Chalakudy	Kerala	February 2021

== See also ==
- Swami Vivekananda Planetarium, Mangalore
- List of Science Centers in India
