= Regional Science Centre, Chalakudy =

Science museum in India

- Established: 2021
- Location: Chalakudy, Thrissur district, Kerala
- Coordinates: 10.30°N 76.33°E
- Type: Science museum
- Owner: Government of Kerala

Regional Science Centre, Chalakudy is a science museum located in Chalakudy, Thrissur district of Kerala, India. It is an autonomous institution established by the Government of Kerala, as a center for popularisation of science and scientific temper among the general public, especially among children. It started functioning in 2021.

== The aim ==
Regional Science Center has been started by the government with the aim of imparting more knowledge about science and its basic principles among the general public, especially among the students. The center, which comes under the Kerala State Science and Technology Museum (KSSTM), will enable students to conduct experiments and research programs in science.

Chalakudy Regional Science Center is one of the National Council of Science Museum's 'Innovation Hubs' aimed at providing facilities to nurture new ideas and develop an inquisitive outlook in the youth.

== History ==
The foundation stone for the Chalakudy Regional Science Center was laid in 2010. It became operational in February 2021.

== The center ==
The Chalakudy Science Center is the third Regional Science Center in Kerala (the other two are located in Kozhikode and Thiruvananthapuram), and the first sub-centre of the Kerala State Science and Technology Museum.

=== Facilities available ===
Science Gallery, Science Park and 3D Theater facilities for children are currently available here. The main attraction is the 5000 square feet planetarium. The 3D theater is a large format film projection system in which 200 people can watch the show in the planetarium theater at a time. The gallery building block that occupies science galleries, 3D theatre, innovation hub and office complex has an area of 27000 square feet. The center is spread over 3 floors.

Of the four targeted science galleries, the Popular Science Gallery and the Mathematics Gallery are currently operational.

The National Council of Science Museums is spearheading the Innovation Hub, which is designed to organize various programs to develop science aptitude among students. As part of the Innovation Hub, the Science Library will provide students with various study classes in science-related subjects and short-term training in specialized subjects.

The observatory, equipped with a high-resolution telescope for aerial observation, can observe the stars and planets in the evening after 6.30 pm. It is also said that special shows will be organized at the center during special celestial phenomena.

At the center, work is also underway to install a mirror maze with endless corridors and endless reflections. This will be the first initiative of its kind in the state.

== Location ==
The center is located on a four-acre plot of land near the Panampilly Memorial Government College in Chalakudy, Thrissur district.

== Admission fee ==
Admission to the Science Center is free for children under the age of four, with an entry fee of Rs.20 for adults and Rs.10 for children between the ages of four and twelve.
