= Swami Vivekananda Planetarium =

3D planetarium in Mangaluru, India

- Pilikula Planetarium

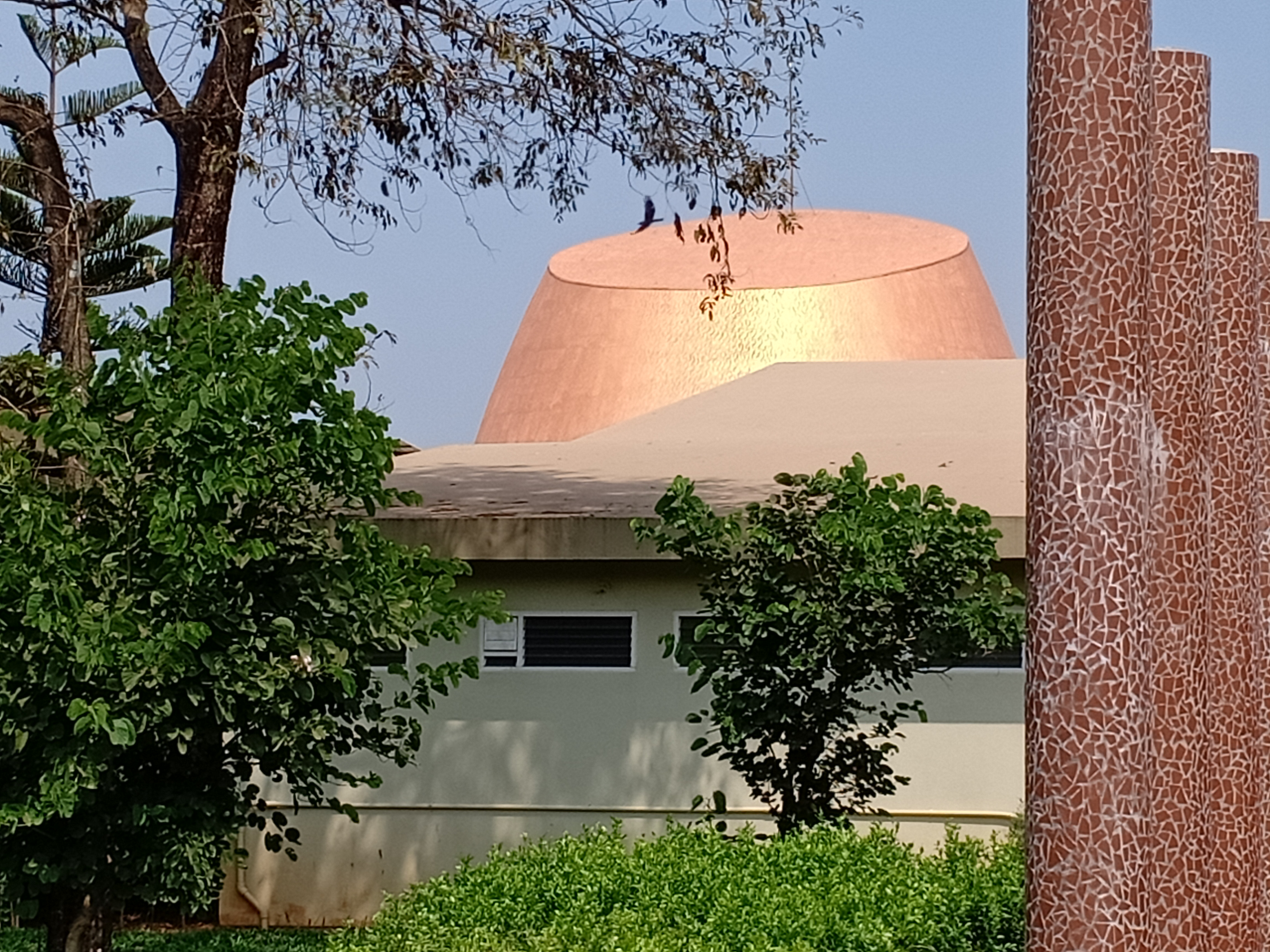
- Dome of the planetarium

- Location at Mangaluru Swami Vivekananda Planetarium (India)
- Established: 1 March 2018
- Location: Mangaluru, Karnataka, India
- Coordinates: 12.8686971°N 74.8384518°E
- Type: Active 3D 8K digital projection
- Director: K. V. Rao
- Curator: Pilikula Regional Science Centre
- Architect: Evans & Sutherland
- Public transit access: City Buses 3A, 3B, 3C, 3K, 3S

Swami Vivekananda Planetarium, also called Pilikula Planetarium, at Pilikula Nisargadhama in Mangaluru is a 3D planetarium in India: the first of its kind in the country. It is also the only such planetarium in the country with hybrid modern technology innovations coupled with 3D technology of 8K digital and opto-mechanical (hybrid) projection system. It is a part of the Pilikula Nisargadhama (covering an area of 370 acres (150 ha)), which is also named Dr. Shivaram Karanth Biological Park. Its creation is attributed to Pilikula Regional Science Centre.

== History ==
Swami Vivekananda Planetarium is the first state-of-the-art 3D planetarium in India. It was initiated in 2013 to mark the 150th birth anniversary of Swami Vivekananda by the then chief minister of Karnataka, Jagadish Shettar, who had laid the foundation stone to build it in two years at a cost of ₹35.69 crore (US$3.7 million). However, the project overran its schedule completion, and the planetarium could be opened only on 1 March 2018. It was set up with grants from KSTePS (Karnataka Science and Technology Promotion Society) of the Karnataka government. The planetarium's objective is intended to give the viewers (students in particular and the public) to see the stars and planetary systems in the universe. Its creation is attributed to Pilikula Regional Science Centre.

The planetarium was planned and established as the first planetarium in the country with 8K digital and opto-mechanical (hybrid) projection system. Five technical persons were initially sent to Utah, US, for training to operate the planetarium. The planetarium also has a provision of ₹1.5 crore (US$160,000) for annual maintenance.

== Technical specifications ==
The planetarium has a dome diameter of 18 m (59 ft) and a seating capacity of 170; the seats can be tilted by 15 degrees to enhance the viewing experience of the audience. It has a Megastar IIA optical projector integrated with digistar and active stereo 3D 8K digital planetarium system manufactured in US by Evans & Sutherland Computer Corporation. The projected 3 dimensional images on the screen are a part of a new level of full dome innovation. The 32 lenses of the 8K ultra-bright LED-based projector, from Ohira Tech Japan, is said to be capable of beaming "20 million stars uniformly and seamlessly over the nano-seam panels of the dome, thereby avoiding the overlapping of projected visuals."

== Programmes ==
The planetarium was inaugurated on 1 March 2018 and started the first public show on 2 March 2018. Eight shows are held daily with each show lasting 25 minutes. Some of the 3D shows screened are We are stars, Dawn of the space age and Mysteries of the unseen world. The shows cover space technology, planets, nature, environment science, history and geography, which are presented in English, Hindi and Kannada. The first inaugural show screened was We are stars which covers the story of space of billions of years from the time of the Big Bang to the modern day.

== Access ==
The planetarium is located at the Pilikula Regional Science Centre at Moodushedde, 9 kilometres (5.6 mi) away from Mangalore. which is well connected by road, rail, and air services with the rest of the country. Mangalore railway station, in the city centre, is connected to the major cities including Chennai, Mumbai and New Delhi. Mangalore International Airport is located about 7 kilometres (4.3 mi) away from the city centre. By road, it is 350 kilometres (220 mi) west of Bengaluru, the capital of Karnataka.

== Gallery ==
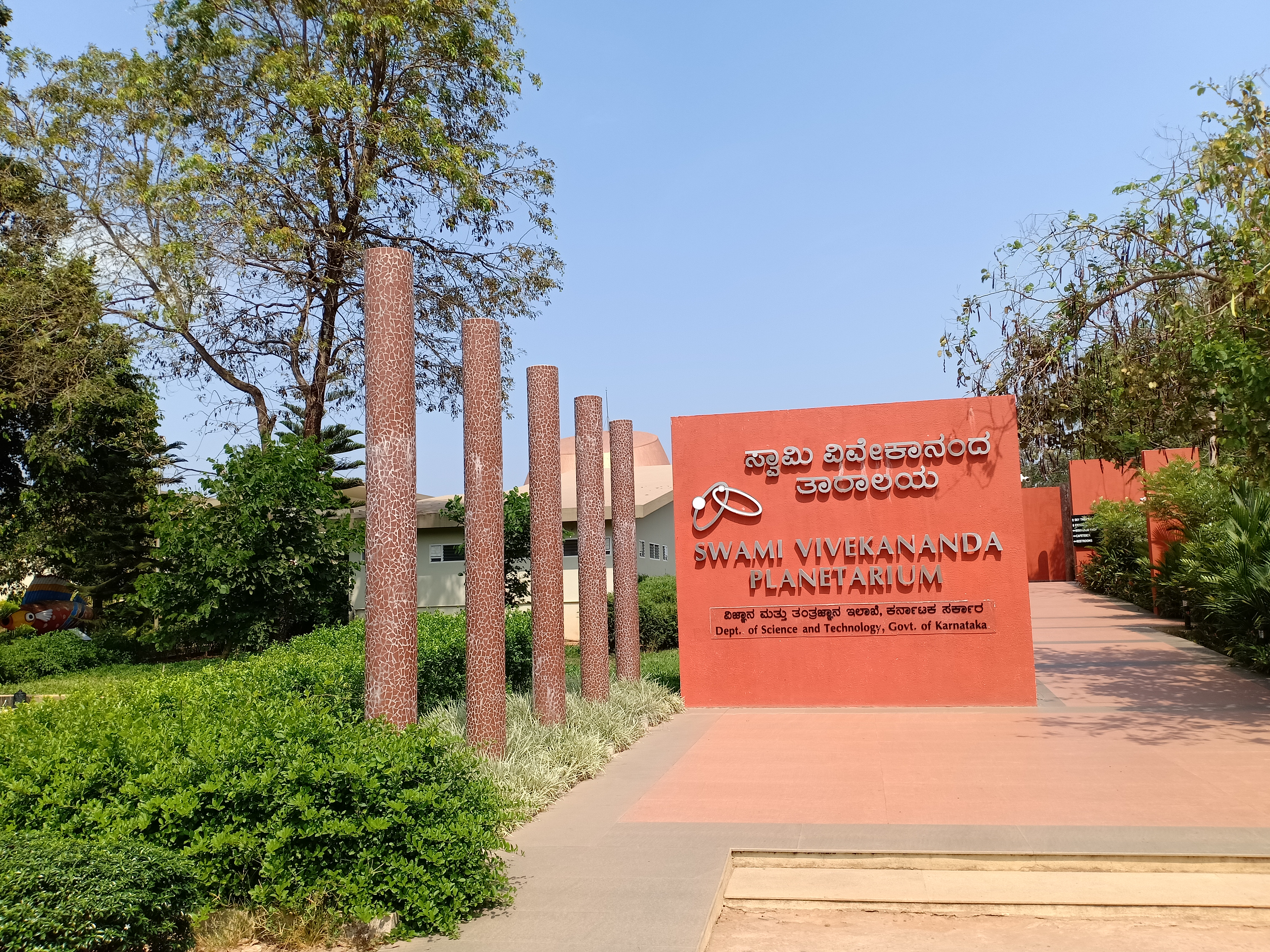
Entrance

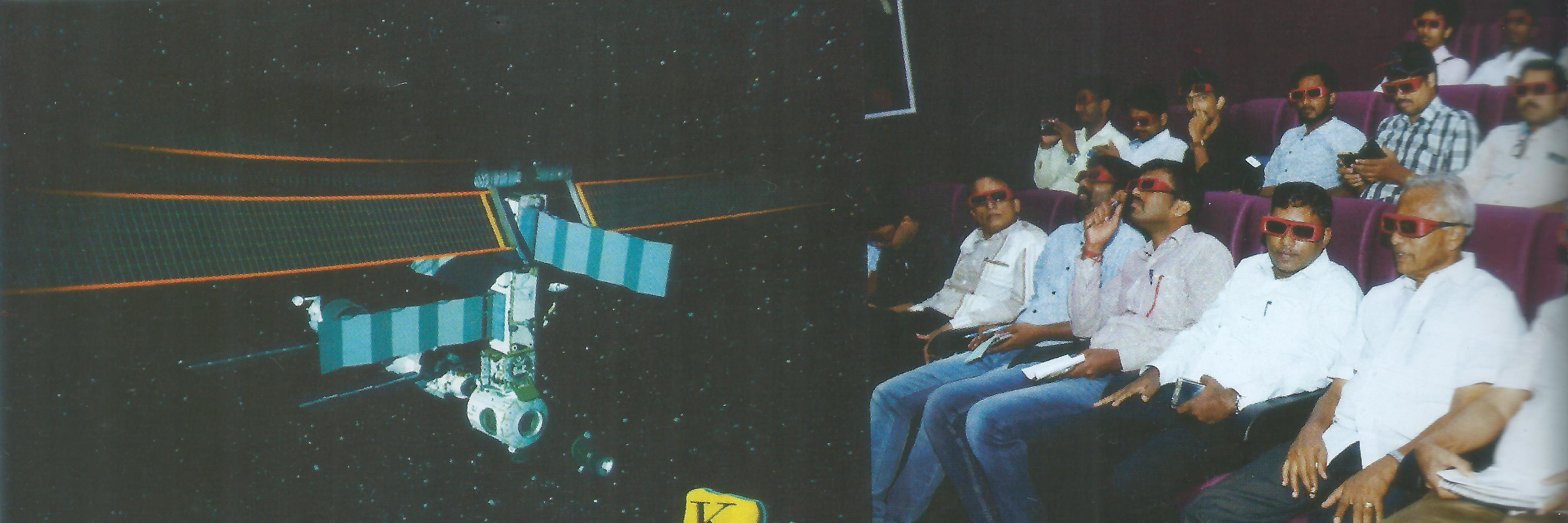
Inside

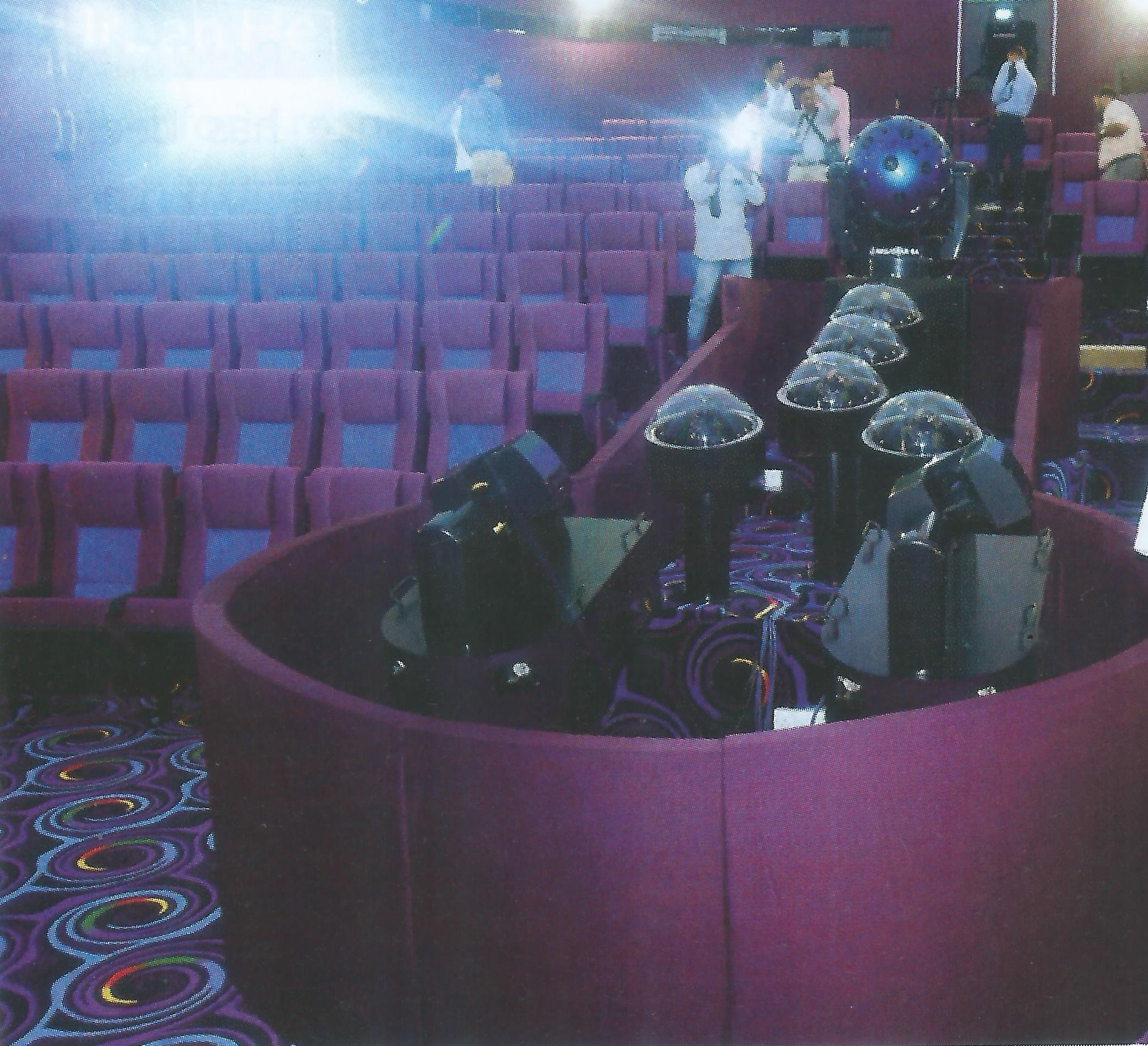
3D 8K resolution projector

Planetarium viewed from the Pilikula Regional Science Centre

== See also ==
- Astrotourism in India
- List of planetariums
