= List of science museums =

Below is a list of science museums all over the world. See Science museum for definitions.

== Europe ==
=== Austria ===
- Ars Electronica Center, Linz
- Haus der Musik (House of Music), Vienna
- Naturhistorisches Museum Wien (Natural History Museum), Vienna
- Technisches Museum Wien (Vienna Technical Museum), Vienna

=== Belgium ===
- Euro Space Center, Libin
- Hidrodoe, Herentals
- Pass, Frameries
- Royal Belgian Institute of Natural Sciences, Brussels
- Technopolis, Mechelen

=== Bulgaria ===
- National Polytechnical Museum, Sofia

=== Croatia ===
- Nikola Tesla Memorial Center, Smiljan
- Split Science Museum and Zoo, Split
- Technical Museum, Zagreb

=== Czech Republic ===
- National Technical Museum, Prague
- Techmania Science Center, Plzeň

=== Denmark ===
- Kroppedal, Copenhagen
- Natural History Museum of Denmark, Copenhagen
- Science Museums, Aarhus
- Tycho Brahe Planetarium, Copenhagen

=== Estonia ===
- AHHAA, Tartu

=== Finland ===
- Arktikum, Rovaniemi
- Heureka, Vantaa
- Tietomaa, Oulu

=== France ===
- Ampère Museum, Lyon
- Cité de l'espace, Toulouse
- Cité des Sciences et de l'Industrie, Paris
- Micropolis (La Cité des Insectes), Millau
- Musée des Arts et Métiers, Paris
- Palais de la Découverte, Paris
- Vulcania, Saint-Ours-les-Roches
- Exploradôme, Vitry-sur-Seine

=== Germany ===
- Deutsches Museum, Munich
- experimenta, Heilbronn
- German Hygiene Museum, Dresden
- German Museum of Technology (Berlin)
- Hermann Oberth Space Travel Museum, Feucht, Bavaria
- Mathematikum, Gießen
- Mathematisch-Physikalischer Salon, Dresden
- Museum für Kommunikation, Frankfurt
- Naturmuseum Senckenberg, Frankfurt
- Otto-Lilienthal-Museum, Anklam
- Phaeno Science Center, Wolfsburg
- Rheinisches Industriemuseum, Oberhausen, Ratingen, Solingen, Bergisch Gladbach, Engelskirchen, Euskirchen
- Sinsheim Auto & Technik Museum
- Technikmuseum Speyer
- TECHNOSEUM, Mannheim
- Spectrum – German Museum of Technology (Berlin), Berlin
- Völklinger Hütte (Völklingen Ironworks), Völklingen
- Universum Science Center, Bremen
- German Space Travel Exhibition, Morgenröthe-Rautenkranz

=== Greece ===
- OTE Museum of Telecommunications, Kifisia, Athens
- Thessaloniki Science Center and Technology Museum, Thessaloniki

=== Hungary ===
- Hungarian Natural History Museum, Budapest

=== Monaco ===
- Oceanographic Museum
- Scientific Centre of Monaco, Monaco-Ville

=== Ireland (Republic) ===
- Birr Castle, County Offaly (contains Ireland's Historic Science Centre)
- Blackrock Castle, Cork (observatory)
- National Science Museum at Maynooth
- Science Gallery, Dublin

=== Italy ===
- Città della Scienza, Naples
- Museo Civico di Storia Naturale di Milano, Milan
- Museo Nazionale Scienza e Tecnologia Leonardo da Vinci, Milan
- Museo Galileo, Florence
- University History Museum, University of Pavia, Pavia

=== Netherlands ===
- Discovery Center Continium, Kerkrade
- Ithaka Science Center, Tegelen
- Museon, The Hague
- Museum Boerhaave, Leiden
- Naturalis Biodiversity Center, Leiden
- Science Center NEMO, Amsterdam
- Teyler's Museum, Haarlem

=== Norway ===
- Norwegian Museum of Science and Technology, Oslo
- Trondheim Science Museum, Trondheim
- The Science Factory, Sandnes
- Vitemeir Science Centre, Kaupanger

=== Poland ===
- Copernicus Science Centre, Warsaw
- EC1 Science and Technology Center in Łódź, Łódź
- Hydropolis Centre for Ecological Education, Wrocław

=== Portugal ===
- National Museum of Natural History and Science, Lisbon, Lisbon
- Science Museum of the University of Coimbra, Coimbra
- Visionarium, Santa Maria da Feira

=== Romania ===
- Ştefan Procopiu Science and Technology Museum, Iaşi
- "Prof.eng. Dimitrie Leonida" National Technical Museum, București

=== Russia ===
- Kunstkamera, Saint Petersburg
- Polytechnical Museum, Moscow
- Memorial Museum of Cosmonautics, Moscow
- Memorial Museum of Kazan School of Chemistry, Kazan

=== Serbia ===
- Nikola Tesla Museum, Belgrade

=== Spain ===
- Ciutat de les Arts i les Ciències, Valencia
- CosmoCaixa Barcelona, Barcelona
- La Casa de la Ciencia, Seville
- Museum of Natural Sciences, Barcelona
- Museo Nacional de Ciencias Naturales, Madrid
- Parque de las Ciencias (Granada), Granada

=== Sweden ===
- Universeum, Gothenburg
- Teknikens Hus, Luleå
- Museum of Ethnography, Stockholm
- Swedish National Museum of Science and Technology, Stockholm
- Tom Tits Experiment, Södertälje

=== Switzerland ===
- Microcosm, CERN, Meyrin
- Technorama, Winterthur
- Verkehrshaus der Schweiz (Swiss Museum of Transport), Lucerne

=== Turkey ===
- Feza Gürsey Science Centre, Ankara 1993
- ITU Science Center, Istanbul
- Istanbul Museum of the History of Science and Technology in Islam (İstanbul İslam Bilim ve Teknoloji Tarihi Müzesi), Istanbul
- Rahmi M. Koç Museum, Istanbul
- Silahtarağa Power Station Energy Museum, Istanbul

=== United Kingdom ===
==== England ====
- Army Medical Services Museum, Mytchett, Surrey
- Anaesthesia Heritage Centre, London
- At-Bristol, Bristol
- Benjamin Franklin House, London
- Bletchley Park, Bletchley
- British Dental Association Museum, London
- British Optical Association Museum, London
- British Red Cross Museum, London
- Cambridge Science Centre, Cambridge
- Catalyst, Cheshire
- Centre for Life, Newcastle upon Tyne
- Discovery Museum, Newcastle upon Tyne
- Enginuity, Shropshire
- Fleming Museum, London
- Florence Nightingale Museum, London
- Foredown Tower Countryside Centre, Portslade, Sussex
- Glenside Museum, Bristol
- Herschel Museum of Astronomy, Bath
- Hunterian Museum at Royal College of Surgeons, London
- INTECH, Winchester
- Manchester Museum, Manchester
- Michael Faraday Museum, London
- Museum of Bath at Work, Bath
- Museum of Science and Industry in Manchester, Manchester
- Museum of the History of Science, University of Oxford, Oxford
- National Conservation Centre, Liverpool
- National Maritime Museum, Greenwich
- National Space Centre, Leicester
- Natural History Museum, London
- Old Operating Theatre, London
- Porthcurno Telegraph Museum, Porthcurno, Cornwall
- REME Museum of Technology, Arborfield, Berkshire
- Royal Institution: Faraday Museum, London
- Royal London Hospital Museum and Archives, London
- Royal Pharmaceutical Society Museum, London
- Science Museum, London
- Science Oxford, Oxford
- Shildon Locomotion Museum, Shildon, Durham
- Snibston Discovery Park, Coalville, Leicestershire
- Thackray Museum, Leeds
- Thinktank, Birmingham, Birmingham
- Winchester Science Centre, Winchester
- Whipple Museum of the History of Science, University of Cambridge, Cambridge
- Woolsthorpe Manor, Woolsthorpe-by-Colsterworth, Lincolnshire

==== Northern Ireland ====
- Armagh Planetarium, Armagh

==== Scotland ====
- Aberdeen Science Centre, Aberdeen
- Dundee Science Centre, Dundee
- Dynamic Earth (Edinburgh), Edinburgh
- Glasgow Science Centre, Glasgow
- Mills Observatory, Dundee
- Our Dynamic Earth in Edinburgh
- Satrosphere Science Centre, Aberdeen
- Surgeons' Hall, Edinburgh

==== Wales ====
- Techniquest, Cardiff Bay
- Xplore! (formerly Techniquest Glyndŵr), Wrexham

=== Ukraine ===
- Kharkiv Institute of Physics and Technology, Kharkiv
- New Energy, Ivano-Frankivsk, Ukraine

== Latin America ==
=== Argentina ===
- Galileo Galilei planetarium, Parque Tres de Febrero, Palermo, Buenos Aires
- Parque Astronòmico la Punta, Universidad de La Punta, Ciudad de La Punta, San Luis, Argentina

=== Brazil ===
- Museum of Life, Rio de Janeiro
- National Museum of Brazil, Rio de Janeiro
- Museum of Science and Technology (PUCRS), Porto Alegre
- Catavento Museum, São Paulo

=== Colombia ===
- Parque Explora, Medellín
- Maloka Museum, Bogotá

=== Mexico ===
- Alfa Planetarium, Monterrey, Nuevo León
- Museo Descubre, Aguascalientes
- Museo Interactivo de Xalapa, Xalapa, Veracruz
- Universum (UNAM), Mexico City
- Museo Modelo de Ciencias e Industria, Toluca, State of Mexico
- Palace of the Inquisition (Museum of Mexican Medicine), Mexico City
- San Pedro y San Pablo College (Museum of Light), Mexico City

== North America ==
=== Canada ===
(listed by province)

For all categorized science museums in Canada, see: Science museums in Canada

==== Alberta ====
- Telus Spark, Calgary
- Telus World of Science, Edmonton

==== British Columbia ====
- Beaty Biodiversity Museum, Vancouver
- H. R. MacMillan Space Centre, Vancouver
- Royal British Columbia Museum, Victoria
- Science World at Telus World of Science, Vancouver

==== Manitoba ====
- Manitoba Museum, Winnipeg

==== New Brunswick ====
- Science East, Fredericton

==== Nova Scotia ====
- Discovery Centre, Halifax

==== Ontario ====
- Canadian Museum of Nature, Ottawa
- Canada Science and Technology Museum, Ottawa
- Ontario Science Centre, Toronto
- Personal Computer Museum, Brantford
- Science North and Dynamic Earth in Sudbury
- Canada South Science City in Windsor

==== Saskatchewan ====
- Saskatchewan Science Centre, Regina

==== Quebec ====
- Cosmodome (Laval), Quebec
- Montreal Biodome
- Montreal Biosphere
- Montreal Science Centre
- Mont Mégantic Observatory, Notre-Dame-des-Bois

=== United States ===
- Eyring Science Center, Provo, Utah
- Jonsson-Rowland Science Center, Troy, New York
- Sitka Sound Science Center, Sitka, Alaska

== Asia and Oceania ==
=== Australia ===
- Gravity Discovery Centre, Gingin, Western Australia
- Macleay Museum – Sydney University Museums, Sydney, New South Wales
- Melbourne Museum, Melbourne, Victoria
- MOD., UniSA, Adelaide, South Australia
- Powerhouse Museum, Sydney
- Queensland Museum, Brisbane, Queensland
- Questacon – The National Science and Technology Centre, Canberra, ACT
- Scienceworks Museum, Melbourne
- Scitech, Perth, Western Australia
- South Australian Museum, Adelaide

=== Bangladesh ===
- National Museum of Science and Technology

=== Brunei ===
- Seria Energy Lab, Seria

=== China ===
- China Science and Technology Museum, Beijing
- Chongqing Science and Technology Museum, Chongqing
- Beijing Museum of Natural History
- Guangdong Science Center, Guangzhou
- Hunan Science and Technology Museum, Changsha
- Shanghai Science and Technology Museum, Pudong, Shanghai
- Sichuan Science and Technology Museum, Sichuan

=== Hong Kong ===
- Health Education Exhibition and Resource Centre, Kowloon Park
- Hong Kong Museum of Medical Sciences, Mid-Levels
- Fanling Environmental Resource Centre, Fanling
- Hong Kong Science Museum, Tsim Sha Tsui
- Hong Kong Space Museum, Tsim Sha Tsui
- Jockey Club Museum of Climate Change, New Territories

=== India ===
- Birla Industrial & Technological Museum, Kolkata
- Birla Science Museum, Hyderabad
- Birla Planetarium, Chennai
- Dr. A. P. J. Abdul Kalam Science City, Patna
- Goa Science Centre, Goa
- Gujarat Science City, Ahmedabad
- Birla Planetarium, Chennai
- Hakim Karam Hussain Museum on History of Medicine and Sciences
- Kerala Science and Technology Museum, Thiruvananthapuram
- National Council of Science Museums (NCSM)
- National Science Centre, Delhi
- Nehru Museum of Science and Technology, Kharagpur
- Nehru Science Centre, Mumbai
- Pimpri Chinchwad Science Park, Pune
- Pushpa Gujral Science City, Kapurthala
- Raman Science Centre, Nagpur
- Ranchi Science Centre, Jharkhand
- Regional Science Centre, Bhopal
- Salem Science Park, Salem
- Science Centre Surat, Surat
- Science City Kolkata, Kolkata
- Science Park, Jaipur
- Srikrishna Science Centre, Patna
- Visvesvaraya Industrial and Technological Museum, Bangalore

=== Indonesia ===
- Bandung Geological Museum, Bandung
- Puspa Iptek Sundial, Bandung
- Bogor Zoology Museum, Bogor
- Jakarta Planetarium and Observatory, Taman Ismail Marzuki, Jakarta
- Taman Pintar Yogyakarta, Yogyakarta

=== Iran ===
- Iran National museum of science and technology, Tehran

=== Israel ===
- Bloomfield Science Museum, Jerusalem
- Israel National Museum of Science, Technology, and Space, Haifa
- Carasso Science Park, Beer Sheva
- Clore Garden of Science, Rehovot

=== Japan ===
- Chiba Museum of Science and Industry
- Gifu City Science Museum, Gifu, Gifu Prefecture
- Hiroshima Children's Museum, Hiroshima
- Miraikan, Tokyo
- Nagoya City Science Museum, Nagoya
- National Museum of Nature and Science, Tokyo, Japan
- Osaka Science Museum, Osaka, Japan
- Science Museum of Map and Survey, Tsukuba City
- Yamanashi Science Museum

=== Macau ===
- Macao Science Center, Macau

=== Malaysia ===
- Petrosains, Kuala Lumpur
- Pusat Sains Negara (National Science Centre), Kuala Lumpur
- The Green Connection, Kota Kinabalu

=== New Zealand ===
- Exscite, Hamilton, New Zealand
- Museum of Transport and Technology, Western Springs, Auckland
- Otago Museum, Dunedin
- Te Manawa, Palmerston North

=== Pakistan ===
- MagnifiScience Centre, Karachi

=== Philippines ===
- The Mind Museum, Bonifacio Global City, Taguig
- National Museum of Natural History, Rizal Park, City of Manila

=== Singapore ===
- Science Centre Singapore, Jurong East

=== South Korea ===
- National Science Museum, South Korea, Daejeon
- Gwacheon National Science Museum, Gyeonggi-do
- Gwangju National Museum, Gwangju
- Ulsan Science Museum, Ulsan

=== Taiwan ===
- Insect Science Museum, Taipei
- National Museum of Marine Science and Technology, Keelung
- National Taiwan Science Education Center, Taipei
- National Museum of Natural Science, Taichung
- National Science and Technology Museum, Kaohsiung
- National Museum of Marine Biology and Aquarium, Pingtung
- Taipower Exhibit Center in Southern Taiwan, Hengchun

=== Thailand ===
- National Science Museum, Pathum Thani

=== Vietnam ===
- ExploraScience Quy Nhơn, Quy Nhơn

== Africa ==
=== Egypt ===
- Planetarium Science Center
- Agriculture Museum
- Wadi-Hitan-Fossil-Climate-Change-Museum
- Egyptian Geological Museum
- The Children's Civilization and Creativity Center
- Zoological and Geological Museums, Tanta University
- Hurghada Grand Aquarium
- Museum of the Zoology Department, South Valley University
- Kasr EL-Aini Museum, Cairo University
- Medicinal Plants Museum, Cairo University

=== Ethiopia ===
- Ethiopia Museum of Art and Science, Addis Ababa

=== South Africa ===
- Cape Town Science Centre, Cape Town
- Unizulu Science Centre, Richards Bay

== See also ==
- List of natural history museums
- Planetarium
- Science tourism
