= Monegasque Biennial of Cancerology =

Oncology conference

The Biennale Monégasque de Cancérologie (Biennial Cancer conference of Monaco in English) is a congress which takes place every two years and organizes conferences and workshops in the field of oncology, cancer treatment, radiotherapy, pneumology, hematology, general medicine, etc. for health professionals, students and academics.

== History and function ==
The Biennial Cancer conference of Monaco was first organized in 1994 by Dr Michel Hery, the then Head of the Radiotherapy Department at the Princess Grace Hospital of Monaco. Since its inception, this congress has been held every two years in collaboration with Scientific Centre of Monaco and the Princess Grace Hospital at Grimaldi Forum, Principality of Monaco. Currently, the biennial conference is held under the patronage of HSH Prince Albert II and in collaboration with the Association Internationale pour la promotion de Formations Spécialisées en Médecine et en Sciences Biologiques (AFISM), the Association de Développement et de Formation en Cancérologie (ADFC) and the Association Monégasque pour le perfectionnement des Connaissances des Médecins (AMPCM). Xavier Pivot is the current president and Jean-Yves Blay, Gilles Freyer, Gilles Créhange are the co-presidents of the Biennial Cancer conference of Monaco. The conference provides two awards, The Michel Hery Prize and The Albert I Prize, starting from the 12th conference in 2016 recognizing the noteworthy achievements in the concerned fields.

== Conferences ==
Year	Conferences	Details
2020	14th Biennale Monegasque de Cancerologie	
2018	13th Biennale Monegasque de Cancerologie	
2016	12th Biennale Monegasque de Cancerologie	
2014	11th Biennale Monegasque de Cancerologie	
2012	10th Biennale Monegasque de Cancerologie	
2010	9th Biennale Monegasque de Cancerologie	
2008	8th Biennale Monegasque de Cancerologie	
2006	7th Biennale Monegasque de Cancerologie	
2004	6th Biennale Monegasque de Cancerologie	
2002	5th Biennale Monegasque de Cancerologie	
2000	4th Biennale Monegasque de Cancerologie	
1998	3rd Biennale Monegasque de Cancerologie	
1996	2nd Biennale Monegasque de Cancerologie	
1994	1st Biennale Monegasque de Cancerologie	

== Notable publications ==
- Namer, M., Gligorov, J., Luporsi, E. et al. Breast cancer clinical practice recommendations from Saint-Paul-de-Vence: excerpts concerning targeted therapies. Targ Oncol 1, 228–238 (2006). https://doi.org/10.1007/s11523-006-0033-2
- BOISSEAU, Patrick; PIVOT, Xavier; RAYMOND, Eric; ZELEK, Laurent. La nanotechnologie au service du cancer. Compte rendu des 9^{èmes} Biennales Monégasques de Cancérologie, Monaco, 20-23 janvier 2010, Oncologie (Paris). 2010, Vol 12, Num 4, 14 p.; SUP2; ref : 32 ref, ISSN 1292-3818.
- CURE, Hervé; GUASTALLA, Jean-Paul; PAUTIER, Patricia; POMEL, Christophe; PUJADE-LAURAINE, Eric; RAY-COQUARD, Isabelle, Cancer de l'ovaire. Compte rendu des 9èmes Biennales Monégasques de Cancérologie, Oncologie (Paris). 2010, Vol 12, Num 4, 14 p.; SUP1; ref : 23 ref, ISSN 1292-3818.
- Jean-François Bosset. Traitement pré-opératoire du cancer rectal cT3-cT4 résécable.. 8ième Biennale Monégasque de Cancérologie, Jan 2008, Monté-Carlo, Monaco. ⟨hal-00538649⟩
- RAY-COQUARD, Isabelle, Trabectédine: un nouveau traitement dans le cancer de l'ovaire en rechute, Biennale monégasque de cancérologie. Session du GINECO (10; Monaco 2012-01-25)
- Marti, P. Place de la vinorelbine : de l’I.V. à l’oral. La Revue Francophone de Formation en Oncologie 6, 296–304 (2004). https://doi.org/10.1007/s10269-004-0051-6

== Notes ==
- Concours médical. France, n.p, 2000.
- Les dossiers d'oncologie: IXe Biennale Monégasque de Cancérologie; [20-22 janvier, 2010, Monaco]; prise en charge locorégionale multidisciplinaire en cancérologie. France, Springer, 2010.
- Radiopathology of Organs and Tissues. Germany, Springer Berlin Heidelberg, 2012.
- Advances in Radiation Therapy. United States, Springer US, 2012.
- Biomarkers in Cancer. Netherlands, Springer Netherlands, 2015.
- Tomblyn, Michael B., and Dabaja, Bouthaina. Hematologic Malignancies. United Kingdom, Springer Publishing Company, 2012.
- Kagan, Arthur Robert. Modern Radiation Oncology: Classic Literature and Current Management. United Kingdom, Medical Department, Harper & Row, 1978.
- Cumulated Index Medicus. United States, U.S. Department of Health and Human Services, Public Health Service, National Institutes of Health, National Library of Medicine, 1991.
