= Hydropolis, Wrocław =

Water science centre in Wrocław, Poland

Coordinates: 51.1038°N 17.0574°E

Hydropolis
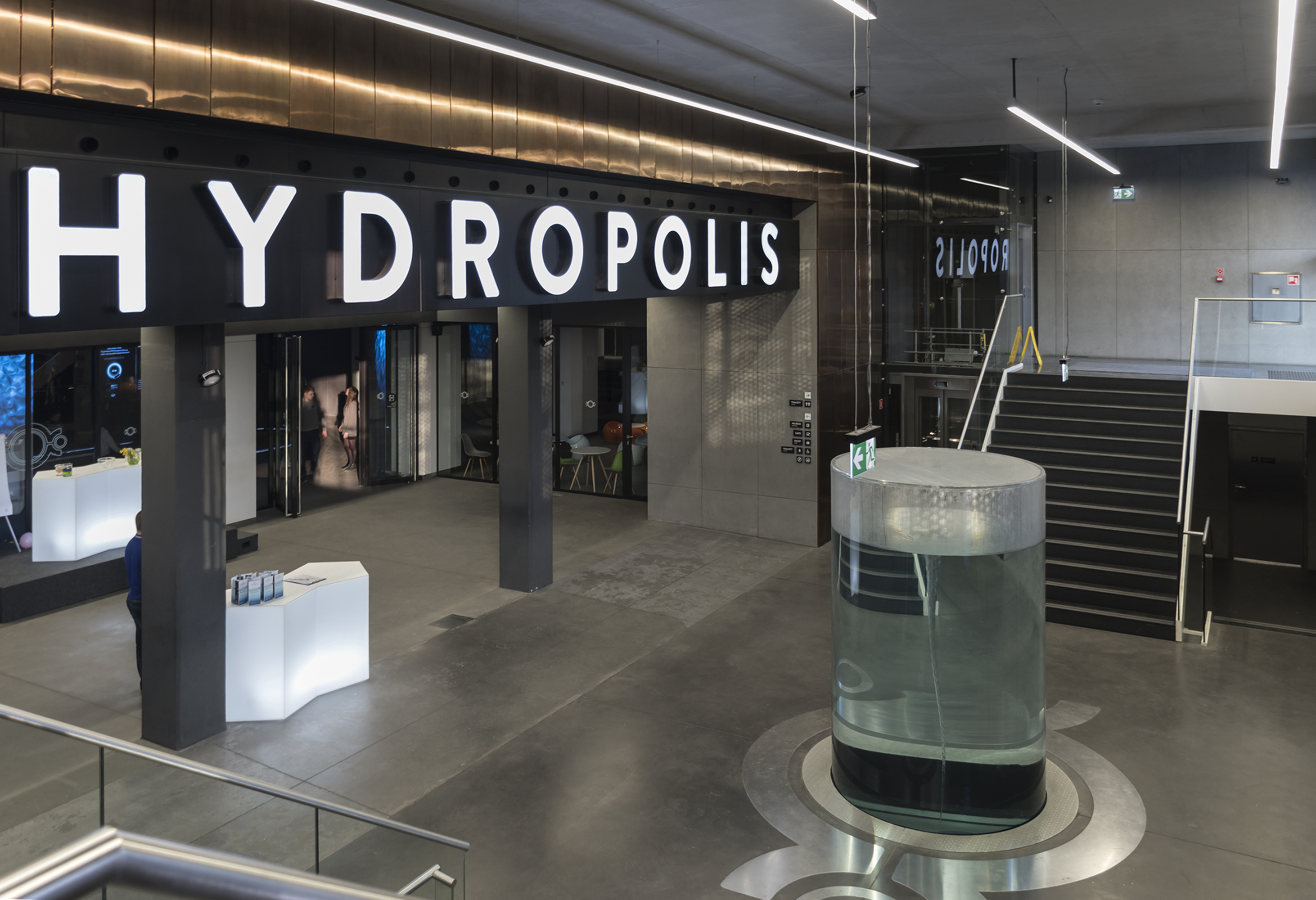

General information
- Location: 17 Na Grobli Street, 50-421 Wrocław
- Opened: December 2015
- Owner: MPWiK Wrocław

Hydropolis (The Centre for Ecological Education "Hydropolis", Polish: Centrum Edukacji Ekologicznej „Hydropolis”) is the only science centre in Poland dedicated to water, located in the city of Wrocław.

Its exhibitions use a variety of technology to teach visitors about the role of water in the environment, its importance to humans, and the history of human interactions with water.

== Background ==
According to its website, "Hydropolis is a place where diverse multimedia technologies, interactive installations, faithful replicas and models, as well as touch screens providing extensive information, serve one purpose - to show water from various fascinating perspectives." The exhibition consists of a series of thematic areas: The Planet of Water, The Depths, The Ocean of Life, Relaxation Zone, Man and Water, The History of Water Engineering, The City and Water, The States of Water, along with a children's zone and a temporary exhibition zone. The centre is fully accessible for people with disabilities. In addition to the exhibition, Hydropolis offers educational workshops for children from kindergarten through secondary school age.

== History ==
The centre is located in a 4600 m² historic neo-Gothic underground reservoir, which had been used for drinking water from the time of its construction in the 1890s. The facility is owned by the city's Municipal Water and Sewage Company (Miejskie Przedsiębiorstwo Wodociągów i Kanalizacji). It was added to the register of monuments in 2002. In 2011 the reservoir was taken out of use, and renovated to create Hydropolis, which opened in 2015.

== See also ==
- List of science centers
