= Monaco Age Oncologie =

Oncology congress in Monaco

- Formation: 2007
- Founder: Michel Hery
- Type: Association for Oncologists and Geriatrics
- Website: mao-monaco.org

The Monaco Age Oncologie (Monaco Age Oncology conference in English) is a congress which takes place every two years and is intended for oncologists and geriatrists with the aim to promote the awareness and discussion about medical and clinical care of elderly cancer patients.

== History ==
The inception of the Monaco Age Oncologie is rooted in the French congress Biennale Monégasque de Cancérologie which also takes place biennially since 1994 in the Principality of Monaco. Michel Hery initiated the congress in 2007 with the aim of creating a platform where oncologists specializing in various pathologies can meet with geriatricians and share their mutual discoveries and experiences in order to make progress in the knowledge of the disease and its therapies. Since the 5th edition of the congress, an honorary award, the Michel Hery Prize has been created to reward notable researchers in the field. Currently, Gilles Freyer is the president of the organizing committee.

Year	Title	Venue	References
2007	1st Monaco Age Oncologie	Monaco	
2009	2nd Monaco Age Oncologie	Monaco	
2011	3rd Monaco Age Oncologie	Monaco	
2013	4th Monaco Age Oncologie	Monaco	
2015	5th Monaco Age Oncologie	Monaco	
2017	6th Monaco Age Oncologie	Monaco	
2019	7th Monaco Age Oncologie	Monaco	
2021	8th Monaco Age Oncologie	Virtual	

== Publications ==
- Compte-rendu du 3ème congrès Monaco Age Oncologie (Monaco, 3 – 5 février 2011)
- Monaco Âge Oncologie et congrès américain en oncologie clinique 2015 Prédire l’avenir des sujets âgés
- Cancer colo-rectal métastatique : quels enjeux chez le sujet âgé ? Evaluation onco-gériatrique : Elément clé de l’optimisation de la prise en charge ? Point de vue du gériatre.
- A tribute to Michel Hery, J. Gligorov · S. Culine · I. Krakowski · P. Marti · J-P Metges · D. Serin · M. Schneider · M. Spielmann
- Agenda. Oncologie 8, 701–703 (2006). https://doi.org/10.1007/s10269-006-0489-9
- Agenda. Oncologie 9, 73–75 (2007). https://doi.org/10.1007/s10269-006-0592-y
- Oncogériatrie : point de vue du gériatreOncogeriatrics: The geriatrician's point of view https://doi.org/10.1016/j.canrad.2009.07.011
- Heitz, D., Castel-Kremer, É. Disparités et inégalités en cancérologie du sujet âgé. Rev Francoph Psycho Oncologie 5, 85–88 (2006). https://doi.org/10.1007/s10332-006-0128-0
- Chemotherapy in the elderly : how and for whom? FORMATION SFC,

== Sources ==
- QE-Mag@zine N° 8 - 2019 by AMP Monaco.
- La Principaute de Monaco, Le premier journal d'actualité de Monaco.
