= Science museum =

Museum focused on science topics

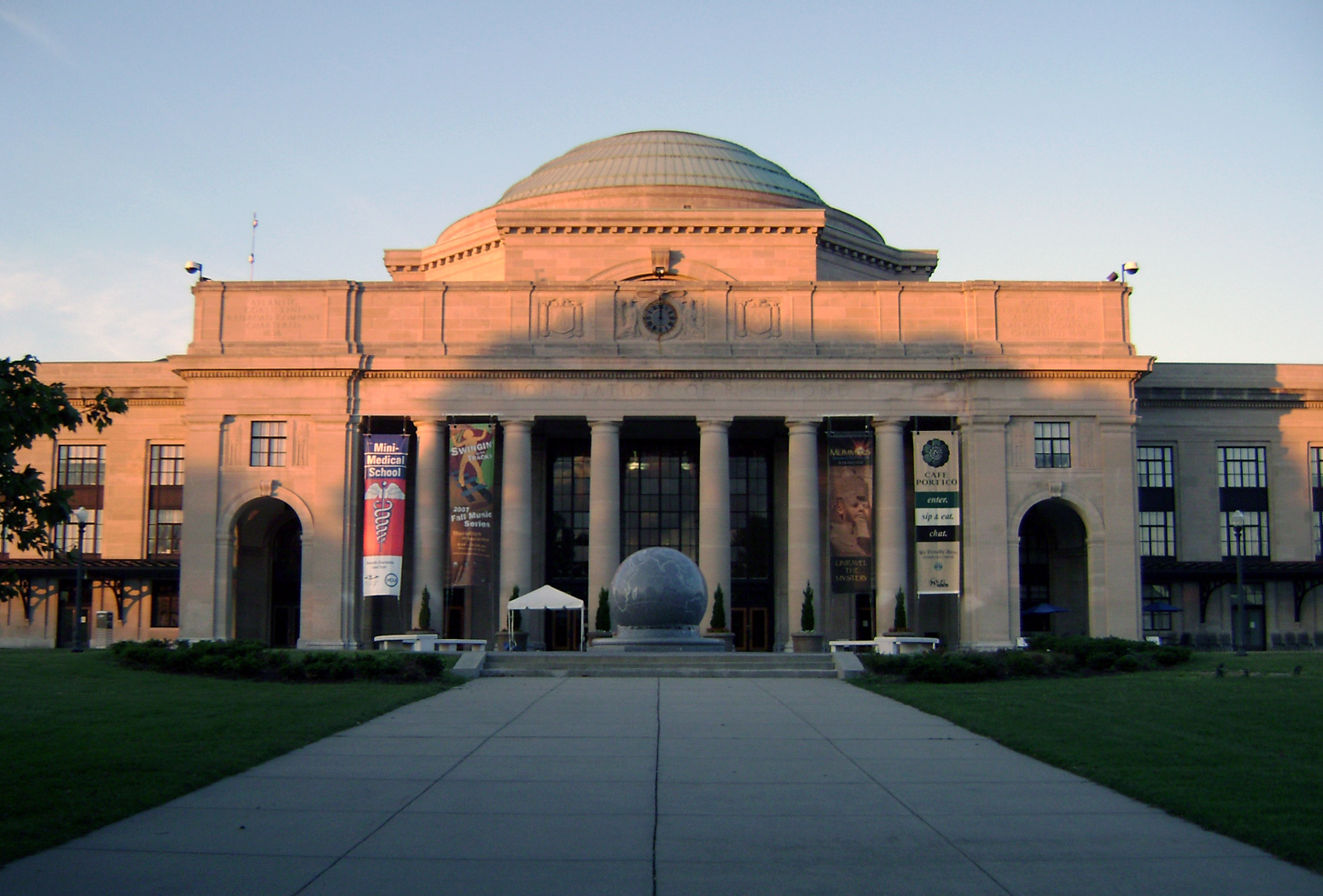
Entrance to the Science Museum of Virginia

A science museum is a museum devoted primarily to science. Older science museums tended to concentrate on static displays of objects related to natural history, paleontology, geology, industry and industrial machinery, etc. Modern trends in museology have broadened the range of subject matter and introduced many interactive exhibits. Modern science museums, increasingly referred to as "science centres" or "discovery centres", also feature technology.

While the mission statements of science centres and modern museums may vary, they are commonly places that make science accessible and encourage the excitement of discovery.

The public museum as understood today is a collection of specimens and other objects of interest to the scholar, the man of science as well as the more casual visitor, arranged and displayed in accordance with the scientific method. In its original sense, the term 'museum' meant a spot dedicated to the muses - 'a place where man's mind could attain a mood of aloofness above everyday affairs'.

— Museum of Jurassic Technology, Introduction & Background, p. 2.

== History ==
As early as the Renaissance period, aristocrats collected curiosities for display. Universities, and in particular medical schools, also maintained study collections of specimens for their students. Scientists and collectors displayed their finds in private cabinets of curiosities. Such collections were the predecessors of modern natural history museums.

In 1683, the first purpose-built museum covering natural philosophy, the original Ashmolean museum (now called the Museum of the History of Science) in Oxford, England, was opened, although its scope was mixed.

This was followed in 1752 by the first dedicated science museum, the Museo de Ciencias Naturales, in Madrid, which almost did not survive Francoist Spain. Today, the museum works closely with the Spanish National Research Council (Consejo Superior de Investigaciones Científicas).

More science museums developed during the Industrial Revolution, when great national exhibitions showcased the triumphs of both science and industry. An example is the Great Exhibition in 1851 at The Crystal Palace, London, England, surplus items from which contributed to the Science Museum, London, founded in 1857.

In the United States of America, various natural history Societies established collections in the early 19th century. These later evolved into museums. A notable example is the New England Museum of Natural History (now the Museum of Science) which opened in Boston in 1864. Another was the Academy of Science, St. Louis, founded in 1856, the first scientific organisation west of the Mississippi. Although the organisation managed scientific collections for several decades, a formal museum was not created until the mid-20th century.

== Modern science museums ==
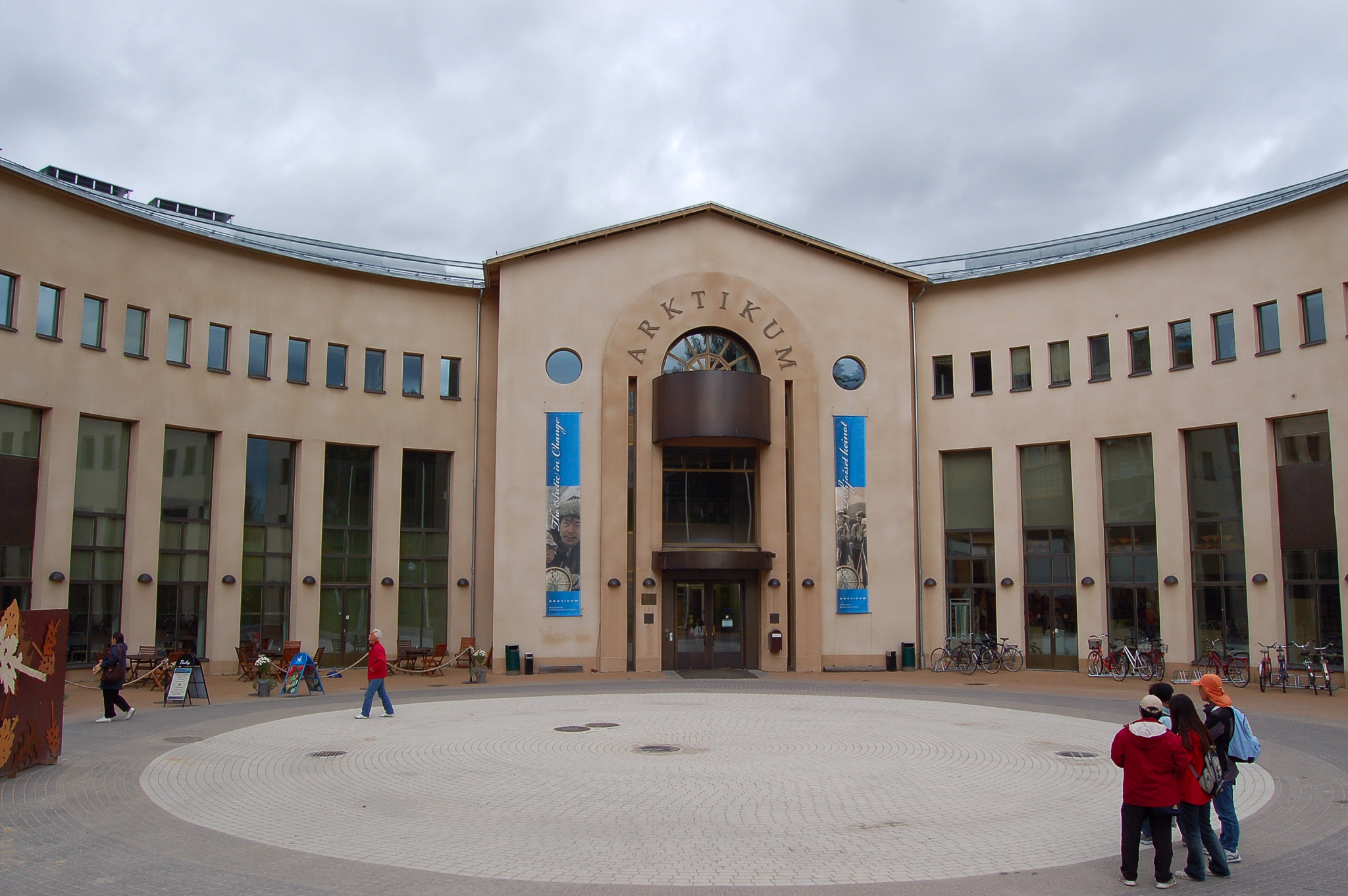
The Arktikum Science Museum in Rovaniemi, Finland

The modern interactive science museum appears to have been pioneered by Munich's Deutsches Museum (German Museum of Masterpieces of Science and Technology) in the early 20th century. This museum had moving exhibits where visitors were encouraged to push buttons and work levers. The concept was taken to the United States by Julius Rosenwald, chairman of Sears, Roebuck and Company, who visited the Deutsches Museum with his young son in 1911. He was so captivated by the experience that he decided to build a similar museum in his home town. The Ampère Museum, close to Lyon, was created in 1931 and is the first interactive scientific museum in France. Chicago's Museum of Science and Industry opened in phases between 1933 and 1940.

In 1959, the Museum of Science and Natural History (now the Saint Louis Science Center) was formally created by the Academy of Science of Saint Louis, featuring many interactive science and history exhibits, and in August 1969, Frank Oppenheimer dedicated his new Exploratorium in San Francisco almost completely to interactive science exhibits, building on the experience by publishing "Cookbooks" that explain how to construct versions of the Exploratorium's exhibits.

The Ontario Science Centre, which opened in 1969, was Canada's first science centre and featured hands-on, interactive exhibits.

In 1973, the Reuben H. Fleet Space Theater and Science Center opened in Balboa Park, San Diego, combining interactive science exhibits with a planetarium and an Omnimax theatre.

Also in 1973, the Association of Science-Technology Centers (ASTC) was founded as an international organisation to provide a collective voice, professional support, and programming opportunities for science centres, museums and related institutions.

The massive Cité des Sciences et de l'Industrie (City of Science and Industry) opened in Paris in 1986, and national centres soon followed in Denmark (Experimentarium), Sweden (Tom Tits Experiment), Finland (Heureka), and Spain (Museu de les Ciencies Principe Felipe).

In the United Kingdom, two early interactive science venues opened in 1986: Launch Pad, a gallery at the Science Museum in London, and Techniquest in Cardiff. A larger wave of UK science centres followed around the millennium, supported by National Lottery grants from the Millennium Commission.

Since the 1990s, science museums and centres have been created or greatly expanded in Asia. Examples are Thailand's National Science Museum and Japan's Minato Science Museum.

The Saint Louis Science Center's James S. McDonnell Planetarium

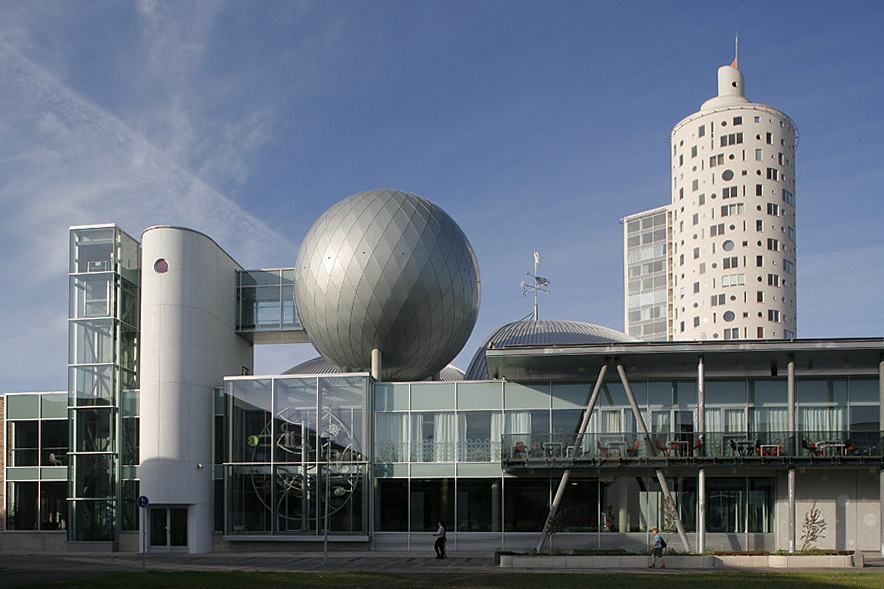
Science Centre AHHAA in Tartu, Estonia

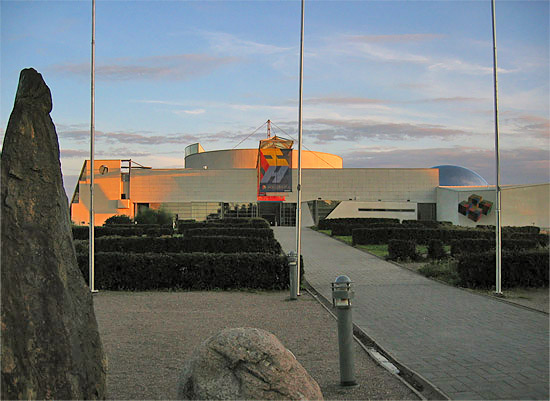
Heureka Science Centre in Tikkurila, Vantaa, Finland

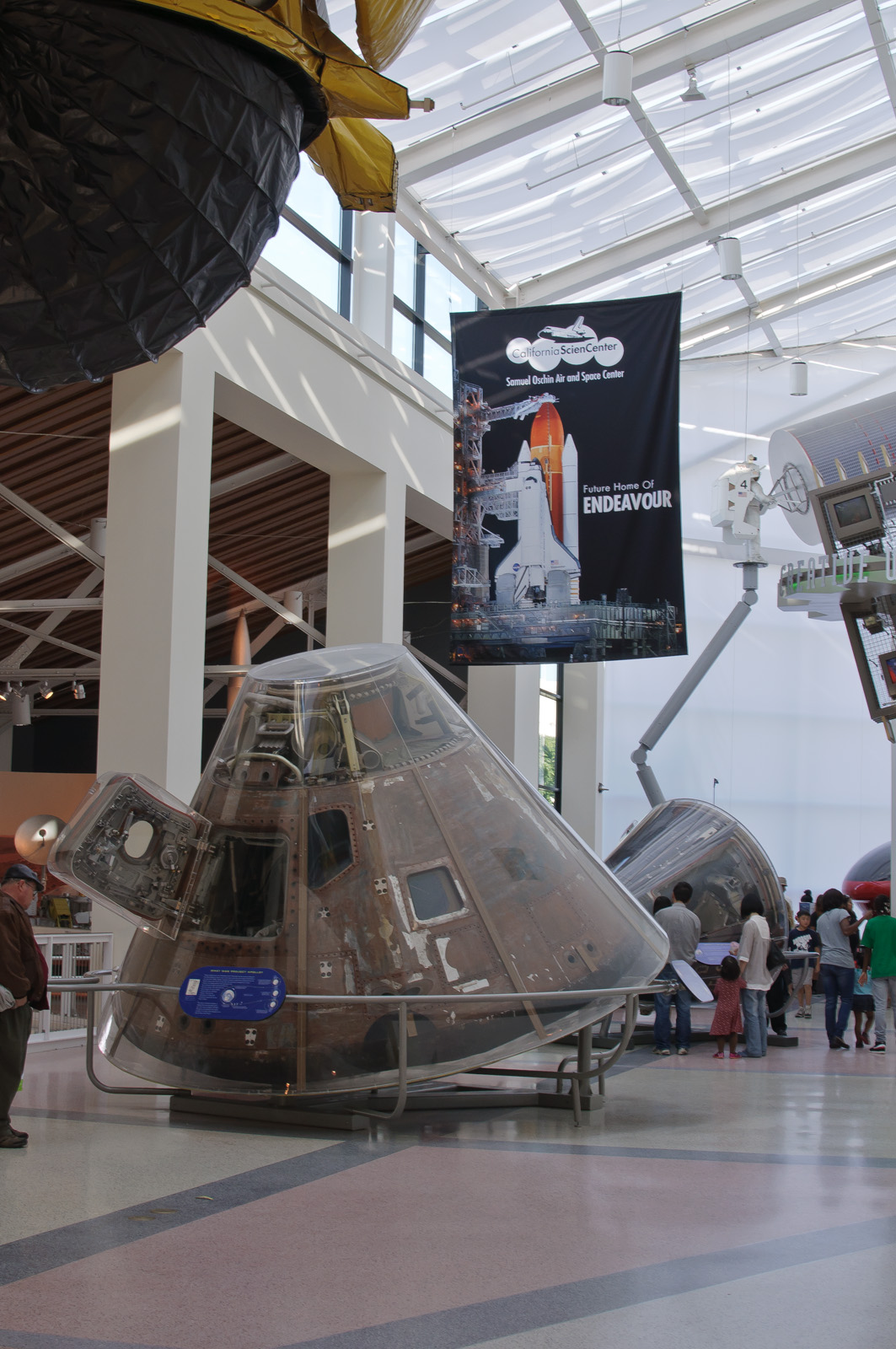
Space exhibit at the California Science Center

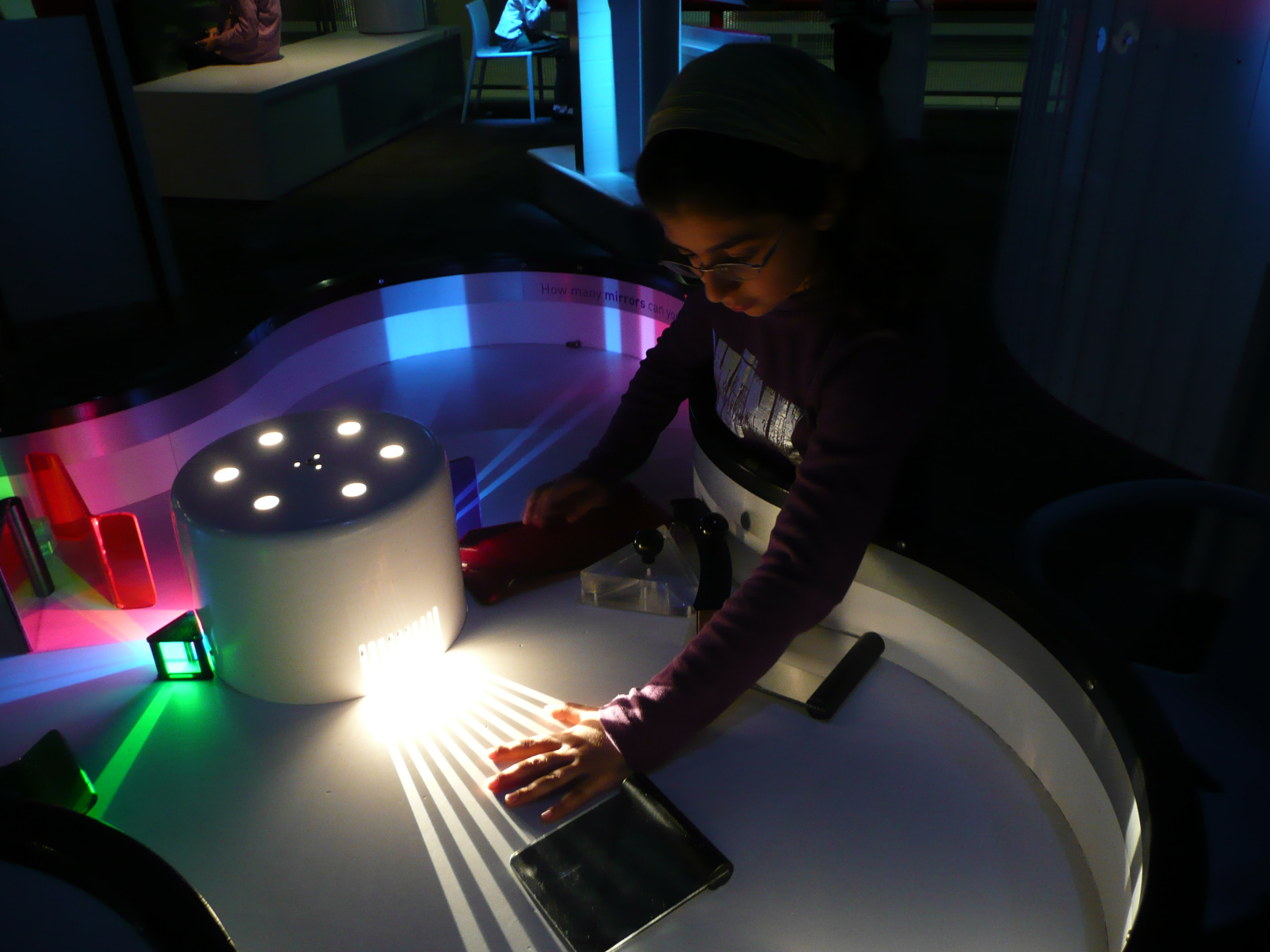
Interactive exhibit at the Science Museum London

== Science centres ==
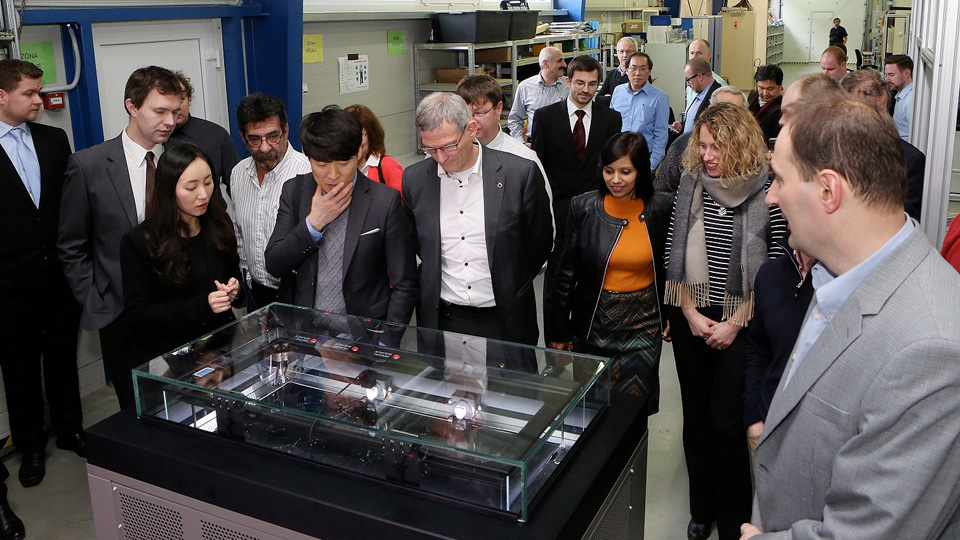
Cloud chambers are very popular among science centres in explanation of radioactivity. Cloud chambers are able to visualise otherwise invisible particles of radiation, thus allowing general public to grasp theoretical concepts in practice.

Museums that brand themselves as science centres emphasise a hands-on approach, featuring interactive exhibits that encourage visitors to experiment and explore.

Recently, there has been a push for science museums to be more involved in science communication and educating the public about the scientific process. Microbiologist and science communicator Natalia Pasternak Taschner stated, "I believe that science museums can promote critical thinking, especially in teenagers and young adults, by teaching them about the scientific method and the process of science, and how by using this to develop knowledge and technology, we can be less wrong."

Urania was a science centre founded in Berlin in 1888. Most of its exhibits were destroyed during World War II, as were those of a range of German technical museums. The Academy of Science of Saint Louis (founded in 1856) created the Saint Louis Museum of Science and Natural History in 1959 (Saint Louis Science Center), but generally science centres are a product of the 1960s and later. In the United Kingdom, many were founded as Millennium projects, with funding from the National Lotteries Fund.

The first "science centre" in the United States was the Science Center of Pinellas County, founded in 1959. The Pacific Science Center (one of the first large organisations to call itself a "science centre" rather than a museum), opened in a Seattle World's Fair building in 1962.

In 1969, Oppenheimer's Exploratorium opened in San Francisco, California, and the Ontario Science Centre opened near Toronto, Ontario, Canada.

In 1972, COSI Columbus, the Center of Science and Industry in Columbus, Ohio, introduced a "camp-in" programme for youth groups, an approach subsequently adopted by other American science museums.

In 1983, the Smithsonian Institution invited visitors to the Discovery Room in the newly opened National Museum of Natural History Museum Support Center in Suitland, Maryland, where they could touch and handle formerly off-limits specimens.

The new-style museums banded together for mutual support. In 1971, 16 museum directors gathered to discuss the possibility of starting a new association; one more specifically tailored to their needs than the existing American Association of Museums (now the American Alliance of Museums). As a result of this, the Association of Science-Technology Centers was formally established in 1973, headquartered in Washington DC, but with an international organisational membership.

The corresponding European organisation is Ecsite, and in the United Kingdom, the Association of Science and Discovery Centres represents the interests of over 60 major science engagement organisations. In Canada, the Canadian Association of Science Centres (CASC) was established in 1985 as the Canadian Council of Science Centres. The Asia Pacific Network of Science and Technology Centres (ASPAC) is an association initiated in 1997 with over 50 members from 20 countries across Asia and Australia (2022). Their regional sister organisations are the Network for the Popularization of Science and Technology in Latin America and The Caribbean (RedPOP), the North Africa and Middle East science centres (NAMES), and the Southern African Association of Science and Technology Centres (SAASTEC). In India, the National Council of Science Museums runs science centres at several places including Delhi, Bhopal, Nagpur and Ranchi. There are also a number of private Science Centres, including the Birla Science Museum and The Science Garage in Hyderabad.

== See also ==
- List of science museums
- Science education
- Science festival
- Science outreach
- Physics outreach
- List of natural history museums

== General references ==
- Kaushik, R.,1996, "Effectiveness of Indian science centres as learning environments : a study of educational objectives in the design of museum experiences", Unpublished PhD thesis, University of Leicester, UK
- Kaushik, R.,1996, "Non-science-adult-visitors in science centres: what is there for them to do?", Museological Review, Vol. 2, No. 1, p. 72–84.
- Kaushik, R.,1996, "Health matters in science museums: a review" in Pearce, S. (ed.) New Research in Museum Studies, Vol. 6, Athlone Press, London/Atlantic Highlands, p. 186–193.
- Kaushik, R.,1997, "Attitude development in science museums/centres", in Proceedings of the Nova Scotian Institute of Science, Vol. 40, No. 2, p. 1–12.
