= Aquatica =

Aquatica may refer to:

- Aquatica (water parks), a chain of water parks in the United States
  - Aquatica Orlando
  - Aquatica San Antonio
  - Aquatica San Diego
- Aquatica KK, an aquarium in Kota Kinabalu, Malaysia, also known as The Green Connection
- Aquatica (beetle), a genus of fireflies

== See also ==
- Psathyrella aquatica, a species of mushroom
- Pachira aquatica, a tropical wetland tree
- Roll No 21 Voyage To Aquatica, an Indian animated film
