= Xavier Pivot =

French oncologist

- Born: April 20, 1967 (age 59); Draguignan, France
- Education: University of Nice, University of Marseille
- Known for: Research on HER2-positive breast cancers
- Scientific career
- Fields: Oncology
- Workplaces: General director of the Strasbourg Cancer Institute

Xavier Pivot (born April 20, 1967) is a French oncologist, university professor, breast cancer specialist and general director of the Strasbourg Cancer Institute.⁣⁣ He is best known for his research on treatments with trastuzumab in HER2-positive breast cancers.

== Early life and education ==
Pivot was born on April 20, 1967, in Draguignan, France.

He graduated with a medical degree from the University of Nice in 1994 and received his PhD in Pharmacology from the University of Marseille in 1998.

== Career ==
Pivot joined the University Hospital of Besançon in 2001 as a university professor and head of the medical oncology department.

In 2016, he was appointed as the President of the Monegasque Biennial of Cancerology.

Pivot was appointed as the Director General of the Paul-Strauss Center and the Strasbourg Cancer Institute in 2017.

== Scientific work ==
Pivot's focus lies in the research of anti-cancer drugs. Since the late 1990s, his main scientific interest has been centered on a therapeutic antibody, trastuzumab, and the HER2 (ERBB2)-positive breast cancer. He has worked on alternatives like lapatinib and on optimizing the use of trastuzumab. He participated in the development of a subcutaneous form that allows for easier administration.

Trastuzumab was the first therapeutic antibody to be included on the WHO Essential Medicines List that identifies medications to which people should have access at all times in sufficient amounts. Pivot has researched improvement to biotherapies and in particular trastuzumab that would cut down on cost and allow more access to medications. His research on this topic has been published in The Lancet.

Pivot's study represented the largest French academic study in breast cancer, carried out with 3,484 patients with HER2-overexpressing breast cancer. Pivot was also involved in the late 2010s in the creation of trastuzumab biosimilars, the aim of which is to offer identical efficacy at a lower cost. He was the scientific coordinator and principal investigator of the first trastuzumab biosimilar registered worldwide in 2017, Samsung BioEpis SB3.

== Membership of learned societies ==
- European Society of Medical Oncology (ESMO)
- American Society of Clinical Oncology (ASCO)
- French Society of Medical Oncology (SOFOM)
- European Organization for Research and Treatment of Cancer
- International Cancer Genomic Consortium (ICGC)

== Publications ==
- Pivot X, Manikhas A, Zurawski B, Chmielowska E, Karaszewska B, Allerton R, et al. CEREBEL (EGF111438): A Phase III, Randomized, Open-Label Study of Lapatinib Plus Capecitabine Versus Trastuzumab Plus Capecitabine in Patients With Human Epidermal Growth Factor Receptor 2-Positive Metastatic Breast Cancer. J Clin Oncol. 2015;33(14): 1564-73.
- Pivot X, Gligorov J, Muller V, Barrett-Lee P, Verma S, Knoop A, et al. Preference for subcutaneous or intravenous administration of trastuzumab in patients with HER2-positive early breast cancer (PrefHer): an open-label randomised study. Lancet Oncol. 2013;14(10):962-70.
- Pivot X, Gligorov J, Muller V, Curigliano G, Knoop A, Verma S, et al. Patients' preferences for subcutaneous trastuzumab versus conventional intravenous infusion for the adjuvant treatment of HER2-positive early breast cancer: final analysis of 488 patients in the international, randomized, two-cohort PrefHer study. Ann Oncol. 2014;25(10):1979-87.
- Pivot X, Romieu G, Fumoleau P, Rios M, Bonnefoi H, Bachelot T, et al. Constitutional variants are not associated with HER2-positive breast cancer: results from the SIGNAL/PHARE clinical cohort. Nature PJ Breast Cancer. 2017;3:4.
- Pivot X, Romieu G, Debled M, Pierga JY, Kerbrat P, Bachelot T, et al. 6 months versus 12 months of adjuvant trastuzumab for patients with HER2-positive early breast cancer (PHARE): a randomised phase 3 trial. Lancet Oncol. 2013;14(8):741-8.
