= Unizulu Science Centre =

Science centre in South Africa

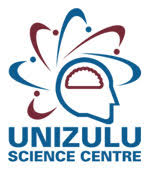

Unizulu Science Centre is an interactive learning centre located in Richards Bay, South Africa. The centre opened on November 6, 1986 and sees roughly 30,000 students annually. The centre has over 130 exhibits and regularly hosts workshops, teacher training, and other instructional activities aimed at improving the educational capacity in the communities it serves.

The science center works in a region comprising over 500 High Schools, many of which remain virtually unchanged since Apartheid and suffer from a severe lack of infrastructure and resources, including lack of access to water and qualified educators. The Unizulu Science Centre is a non-profit organisation and is nationally and internationally recognised for its efforts to uplift science education in disadvantaged regions within Kwa-Zulu Natal.

== See also ==
- List of science centers
