= Indira Gandhi Planetarium =

Planetarium in Patna, India

- Indirā Gāndhī Tārāmaṇḍal
- Established: 20 July 1989
- Location: Indira Gandhi Science Complex, Patna, Bihar
- Coordinates: 25.611°N 85.144°E
- Type: Planetarium
- Visitors: 985,100 (2007)
- Director: Department of Science & Technology, Bihar Government
- Website: dstbihar.softelsolutions.in

The Indira Gandhi Planetarium (ISO: Indirā Gāndhī Tārāmaṇḍal), also known as the Patna Planetarium (ISO: Paṭnā Tārāmaṇḍal), is located in Patna's Indira Gandhi Science Complex. The planetarium was constructed through Bihar Council on Science & Technology at a total cost of about ₹110 million (equivalent to ₹1.2 billion or US$12 million in 2023). It was conceptualised in 1989 by Bihar Chief Minister Shri Satyendra Narain Sinha with construction commencing in the same year, and opened for the public from 1 April 1993. It is named after senior Indian National Congress leader and former Prime Minister of India Indira Gandhi.

The Indira Gandhi Planetarium is one of the largest planetariums in Asia. It attracts many domestic as well as foreign tourists. The planetarium has regular film shows on subjects related to astronomy. It also holds exhibitions, which attract many visitors.

The planetarium, which previously used traditional opto-mechanical projection of celluloid film, now employs a modern digital projection system featuring state-of-the-art Christie projectors installed by ZEISS in 2023. This system enhances the experience with high-resolution 3D projections.

== Modernisation ==
In 2021, modernisation works were taken up for Patna Planetarium. In 2023, six Christie projectors were installed by ZEISS, transitioning the planetarium from its traditional opto-mechanical system to a state-of-the-art digital projection system. The facility underwent a major revamp, and is now equipped with an advanced projection system, acoustic sound and new hanging dome-shaped screen. A high-capacity optical telescope is also set up on its premises. The modernization works completed in April 2024. Online tickets can be booked from its official portal.

== Competition ==
The first digital planetarium of Bihar was planned to open in late 2016 at the premises of Shrikrishna Science Centre near Gandhi Maidan in Patna. The planetarium has been developed at a cost of ₹50 million (equivalent to ₹72 million or US$750,000 in 2023) and is equipped with a Carl Zeiss digital projector system.

== See also ==
- Astrotourism in India
- List of planetariums
- Dr. A. P. J. Abdul Kalam Science City
- Darbhanga Planetarium
- Shrikrishna Science Centre
- Bihar Museum
