= Shrikrishna Science Centre =

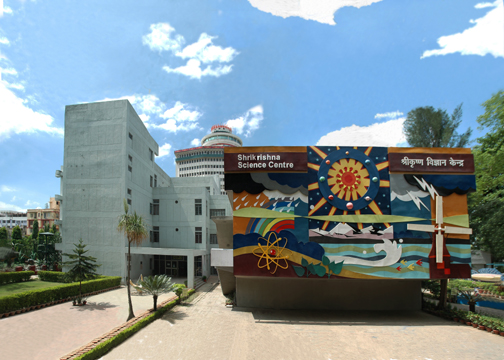
- Established: 1978
- Location: West Gandhi Maidan Marg, Patna, Bihar, India
- Coordinates: 25.611°N 85.144°E
- Type: Science Museum
- Visitors: 158822 (2007-08), 212440 (09-10), 223300 (10-11)
- Director: Sreenu Appikonda (Project Coordinator)
- Website: sksciencecentre.org

Shrikrishna Science Centre is a science museum in Patna, Bihar, India which was named after the first Chief Minister of Bihar, Shri Krishna Sinha. It was inaugurated on 14 April 1978, by the Minister of Education, Shri Thakur Prasad Singh. Shrikrishna Science Centre forms a unit of the National Council of Science Museums, an autonomous body under the Ministry of Culture, Government of India. It is located in the southwestern corner of the Gandhi Maidan. The science centre has been set up for the benefit of the public, especially students. A new innovation hub also been set up to promote critical thinking through activities in science. Various facilities like 3D printing, broadband internet facilities as well as advanced labs are available.

== Galleries ==
The centre is made up of galleries that teach different science topics: the Fun Science Gallery covers physics and maths with 50 hands-on exhibits; the Mirrors and Images Gallery; the 3D show; the Evolution Gallery with 60 interactive exhibits that explain the origin of the universe and its life-forms, including man; Science Park with 40 exhibits where children can play; Jurassic Park with moving dinosaurs; and exhibits on oceans and Indian scientists.

A new gallery on images and mirrors will have around 60 exhibits. The gallery will showcase the concept of reflection, illusive images, 3D images, medical imaging, concept of colours, and digital and virtual imaging. Several immersion virtual exhibits will be part of this gallery.

== See also ==
- Dr. A. P. J. Abdul Kalam Science City
- Indira Gandhi Planetarium
- Swami Vivekananda Planetarium, Mangalore
- List of science centers#Asia
