= Dr. A. P. J. Abdul Kalam Science City =

Science-centered city

- Type: Science Centre
- Legal status: Government
- Purpose: Educational
- Headquarters: Rajendra Nagar, Patna
- Location: India
- Region served: Patna

Dr. A. P. J. Abdul Kalam Science City is a science city.It is built by Department of Science and Technology Government of Bihar to promote and popularize Science among people. It is located at Rajendra Nagar, Patna in the Indian state of Bihar. It aims to promote and popularize science as well as demonstrating and preserving the history of scientific development in Bihar.

== Design ==
The building adopts state of the art technology. It is designed as a G+1 (2 storey) building, covering 30,000 square metres (320,000 sq ft) on a 8.9-hectare (22-acre) site near the Moin-ul-Haq Stadium in Rajendra Nagar, Patna with an estimated cost ₹6,400,000,000 (US$66 million). The construction works of Dr A P J Abdul Kalam Science City is likely to be completed by November 2025, whereas other technical works like installation of science exhibits are expected to be completed by June, 2025.

== Exhibition ==
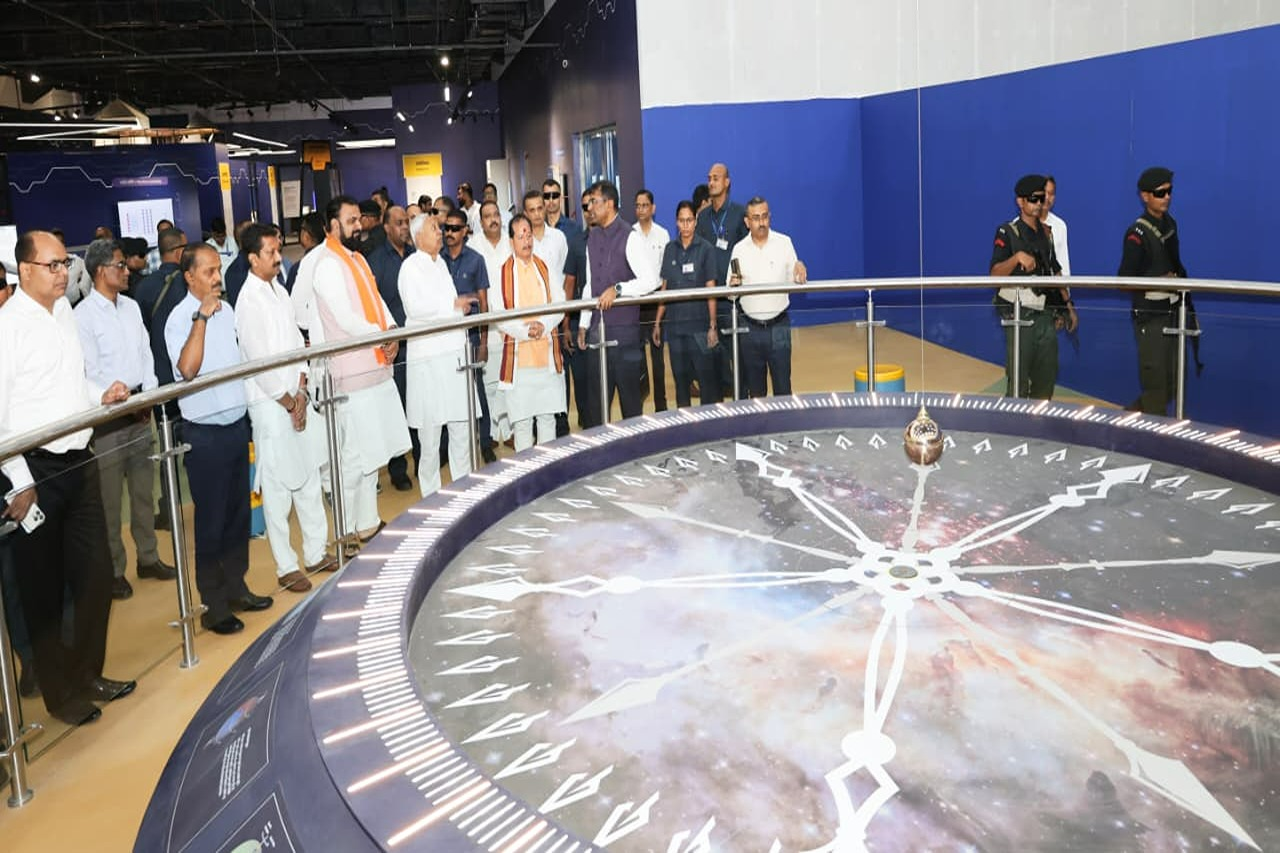
Nitish Kumar and Deputy Chief Minister Samrat Chaudhary inaugurating APJ Abdul Kalam science city in Patna in 2025.

It will have four galleries: Body and Mind, Space and Astronomy, Basic science, Sustainable planet consisting of 243 interactive and realistic exhibits. Along with it there will be a Grand Atrium lobby for entrance, Orientation Theatre, Multipurpose Halls, Temporary Exhibition Halls, 500 seater Auditorium, 300 seater Cafeteria, 4D Theatre, Retails spaces, Bio Diversity Park and many more to it.

== Facilities ==
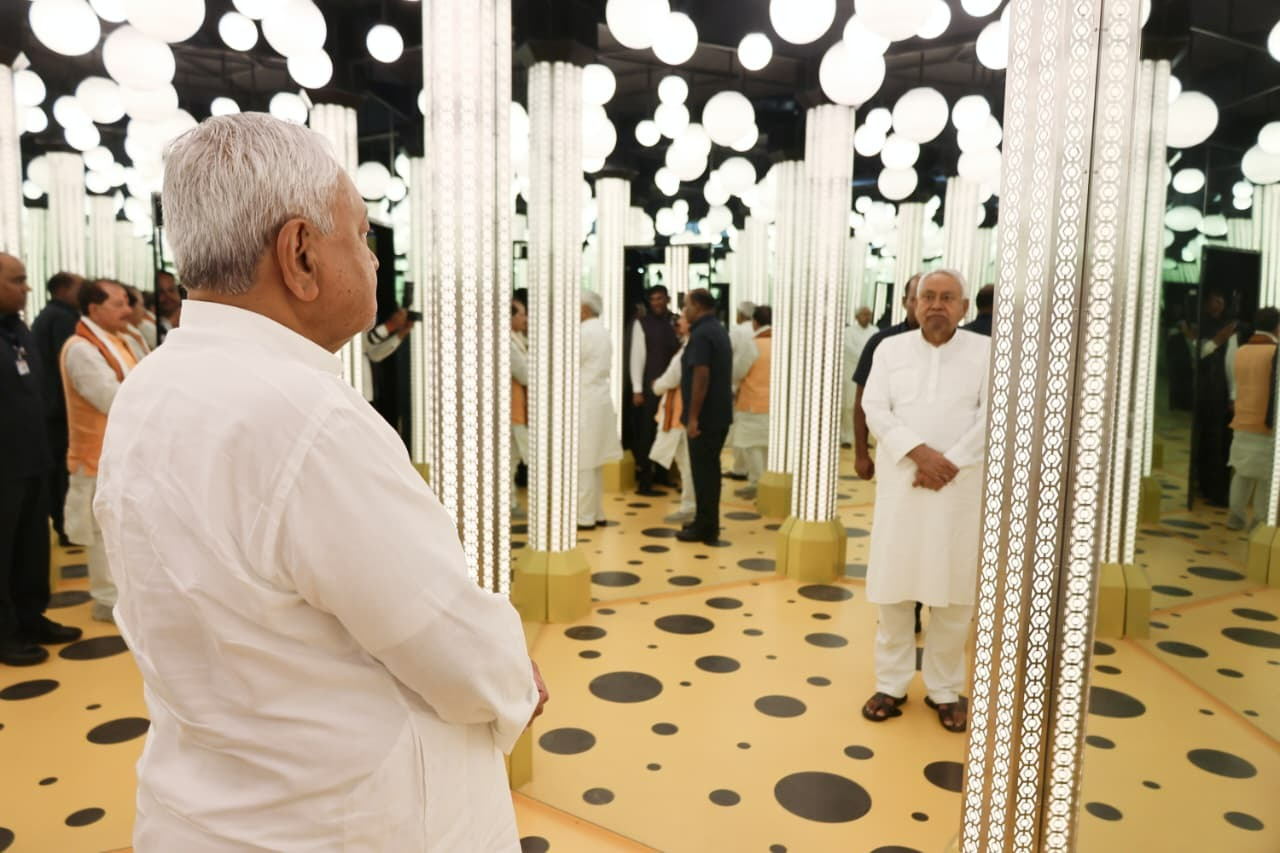
Bihar Chief Minister Nitish Kumar visiting a section of science city after its inauguration on 21 September 2025.

It is to have four learning suites: Marker Space, Big Data Centre, Demo Kitchen and a gym on first floor for children who visit during a study tour or excursion. The dormitory is to accommodate 250 students connected to the learning suites.

== Stakeholders Involved ==
Prime Stake holder is Department of Science & Technology, Govt. of Bihar Partnered with Building Construction Department, Govt. of Bihar for Excitation of Building works. Prime Consultant for the project is Flying Elephant Studio, Bangalore formed consortium along with Gleeds Consulting India Pvt Ltd (Project and Cost management consultant) and Studio Nabila birjis (Interior Consultant) (now known as Atelier birjis) and Gallagher & Associates (Exhibit Consultant) . Execution Agency is Shapoorji Pallonji.

== See also ==
- Shrikrishna Science Centre
- Indira Gandhi Planetarium
- Gujarat Science City, Ahmedabad, Gujarat, India
- Science City Kolkata
- List of science centers#Asia
