= Arthur Good =

French science journalist "Tom Tit" (1853–1928)

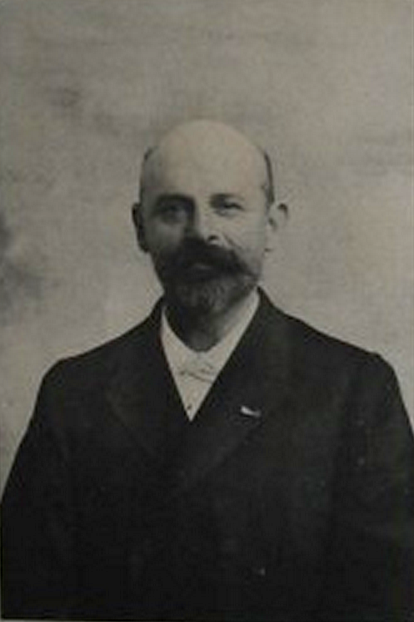
- Born: 16 August 1853 or 26 August 1853; Montivilliers, Seine-Maritime, France
- Died: 30 March 1928 (aged 74)
- Scientific career
- Fields: Engineering

Arthur Good (16 or 26 August 1853 – 30 March 1928) was a French engineer, science educator, author and caricaturist who used the pen name Tom Tit. He wrote a series of weekly articles, La Science Amusante, or Amusing Science, that were collected in book form and have been translated and republished in more than 130 editions in several languages. The illustrations for his do-it-yourself scientific apparatuses have been described as surrealist collages, and were an inspiration for surrealist artists such as Max Ernst and Joseph Cornell.

== Personal life ==
Arthur Good was born in Montivilliers, Seine-Maritime, France on 16 or 26 August 1853. He was the son of Protestant pastor Gustave Frédéric Good (1823–1896) and Louise Stéphanie Monod (1827–1909).

Good graduated from the École centrale des arts et manufacture in Paris, where he studied engineering.

He married Jeanne Valon (1857–1910) in Paris on 6 April 1881. They had four children.

== La Science Amusante ==
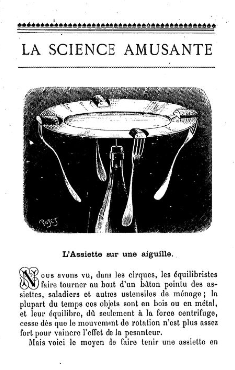
L'assiette sur une aiguille (plate on a needle)

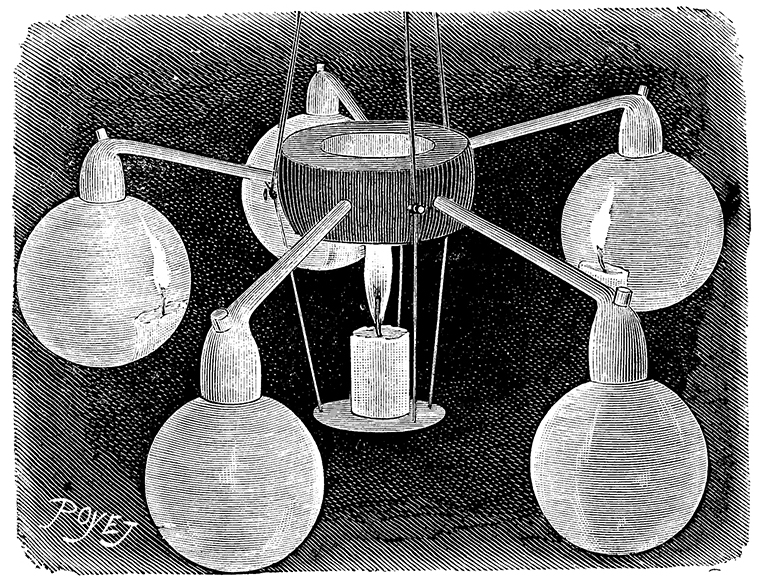
Lustre en bulles de savon (soap-bubble chandelier)

Under the pen name Tom Tit, Arthur Good wrote a series of weekly articles, La Science Amusante 'Amusing Science' for the French magazine L’Illustration. Good presented a range of physical experiments, from "simple games meant to amuse the family" to experiments "of a truly scientific character". They introduce a range of physical and scientific principles including magnetism and surface tension. Good's articles include geometrical demonstrations, craft projects, and physics experiments which can be carried out with everyday household materials. In books such as La Récréation En Famille he emphasized that scientific education could be a common activity and amusement for the entire family. He dedicated La Science Amusante to one of his children, saying "In dedicating this volume today, I would like it to be a souvenir for you of the happy moments we have spent together trying the experiments and constructing the apparatuses".

Good created improvised scientific apparatuses like his Soap-bubble Chandelier using common items such as bottles, eggs, corks, candles, and soap. His constructions have an imaginative charm that has led to them being compared to surrealistic collages. Nonetheless, his drawings were seriously and carefully rendered by scientific engraver Louis Poyet (1846–1913) and his assistants.

The original columns from La Science Amusante were collected and published in a three-volume series in France. Each volume contained 100 amusements. Beginning in 1889, they have been reprinted in over 130 editions. Collections of amusements were translated and published in English, Italian, and Spanish. In the United States they appeared as Magical Experiments, or Science in Play, and in England as Scientific Amusements. A selection has also been republished as 100 Amazing Magic Tricks. Good's books are considered to have laid the foundations for modern approaches to science education in their introduction of "kitchen science" and hands-on experiments for children.

The science centre Tom Tits Experiment founded in Södertälje outside Stockholm, Sweden, in 1987, is named after the Tom Tit character.

== Other publications ==
Good also published instructions for DIY entertainments in Pour Amuser Les Petits ou les joujoux qu’on peut faire soi-même (To Amuse the Little Ones, or Do-It-Yourself Small Toys), La Récréation En Famille (Family Recreations), Les Bons Jeudis (Fun Thursdays – in Good's day in France there were no classes on Thursdays), and Joujoux en Papier (Paper Toys). From 1885 to 1888, he was the editor of a periodical, Le Chercheur, that featured new inventions. He also wrote for La Nature.

In addition to his science education publications, Good published a set of Caricatures of famous Britons in London in 1913. He received a medal of honor from the National Society for the Development of Good (Société nationale d'encouragement au bien).

== Surrealism ==
During the 1920s and 1930s, surrealist artists such as Max Ernst and Joseph Cornell were intrigued by the Tom Tit illustrations, and incorporated them into their own works.

== Gallery ==
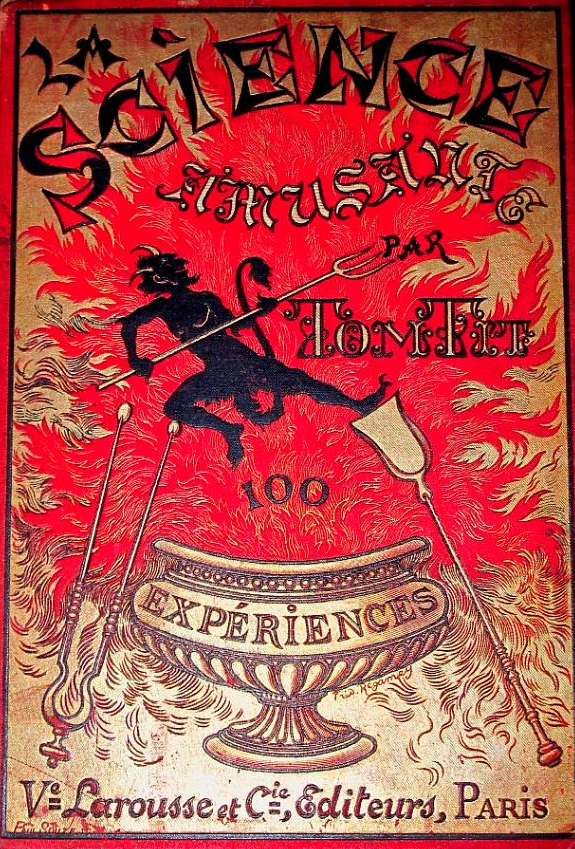
La Science Amusante

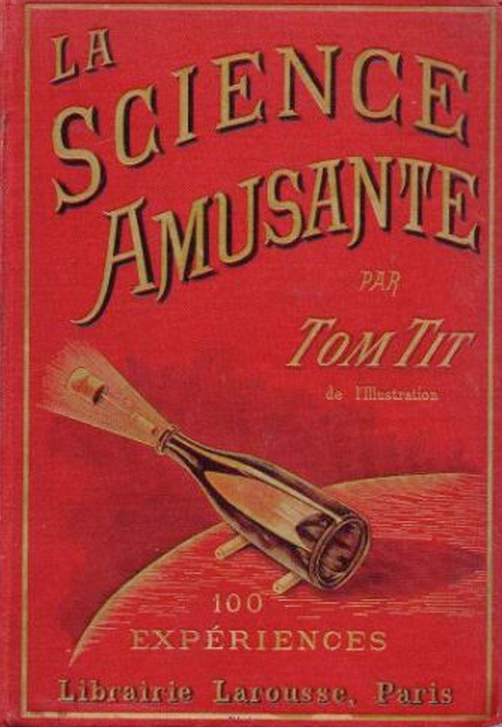
La Science Amusante

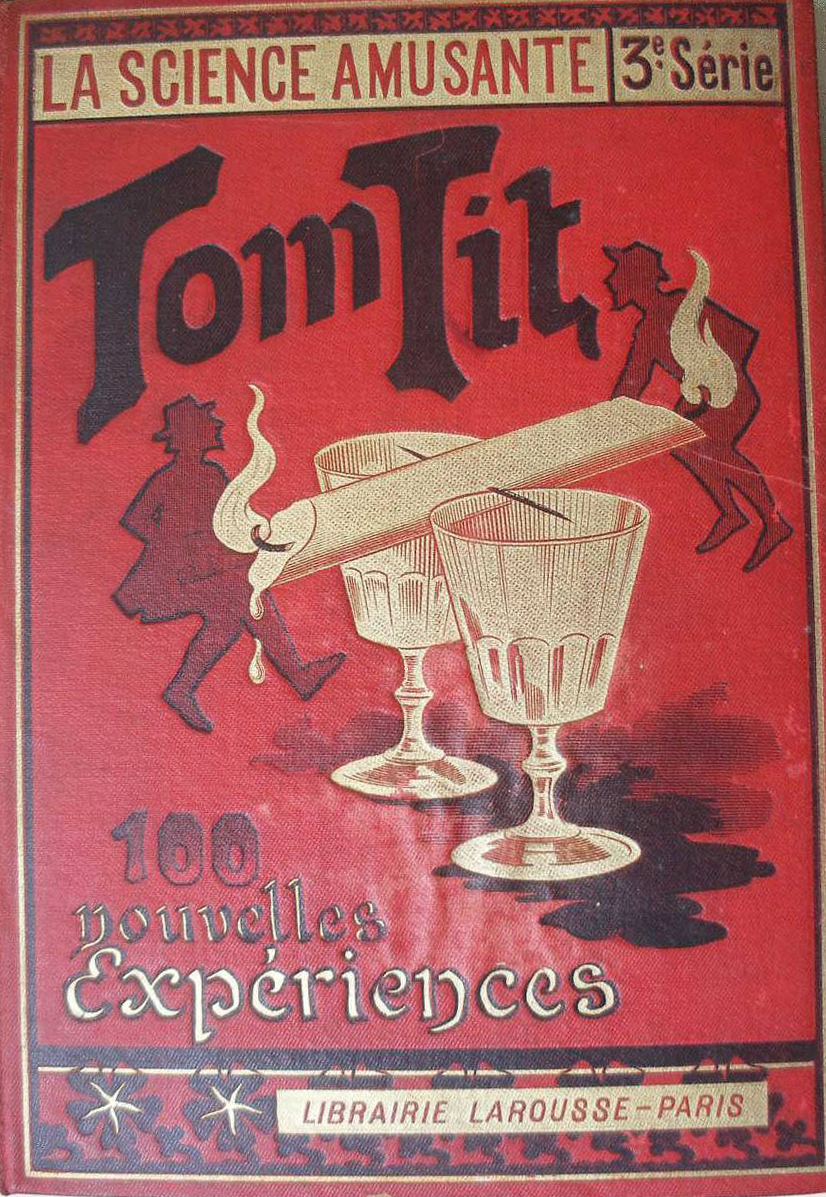
La Science Amusante

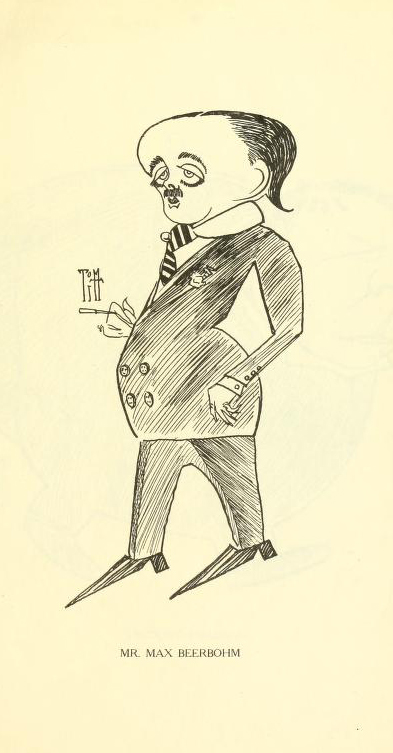
Caricature of Max Beerbohm
