= Ranchi Science Centre =

Science centre in Jharkhand, India

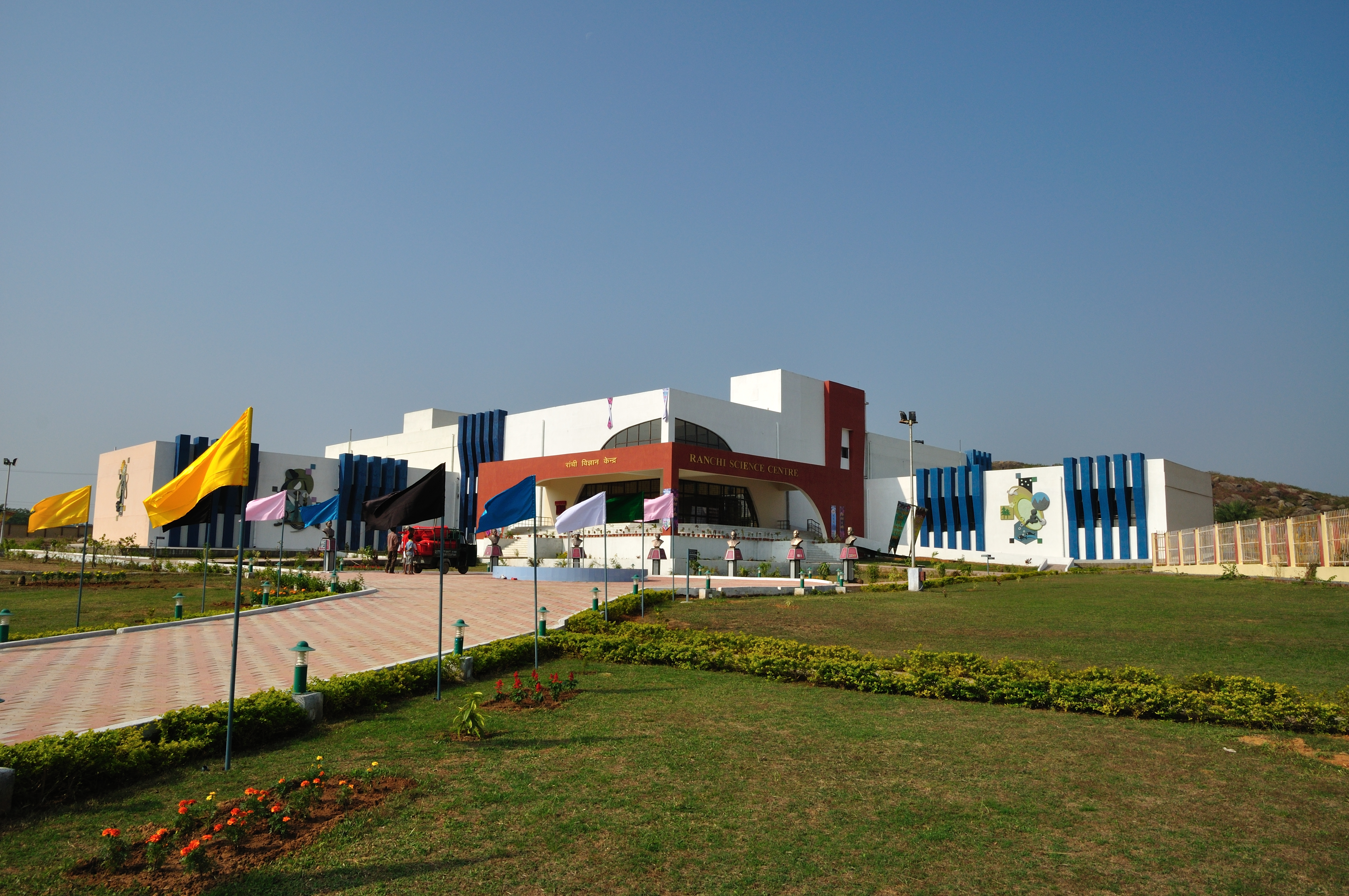
- Formation: 29 November 2010
- Type: Science Centre
- Legal status: Government
- Purpose: Educational
- Headquarters: Ranchi
- Location: India
- Coordinates: 23.407°N 85.340°E
- Parent organisation: Jharkhand Council on Science & Technology

Ranchi Science Centre is the first science centre in the state of Jharkhand in India, under Jharkhand Council on Science & Technology (JCST) of Department of Science & Technology, Government of Jharkhand (GOJ). The centre comprises two storied building that houses three permanent thematic galleries of covered area 42,000 square meter on an area of 13 acre land, provided by Government of Jharkhand, at Chiraundi village, Morhabadi near the Tagore Hill adjacent to Ranchi town at a capital cost of Rs. 87.5 crore or $1,374,494 which has been shared equally by Government of Jharkhand and Government of India. The science centre has been developed by the National Council of Science Museums (NCSM), a wing of Ministry of Culture, Govt. of India. The centre was inaugurated by the chief minister Arjun Munda on 29 November 2010.

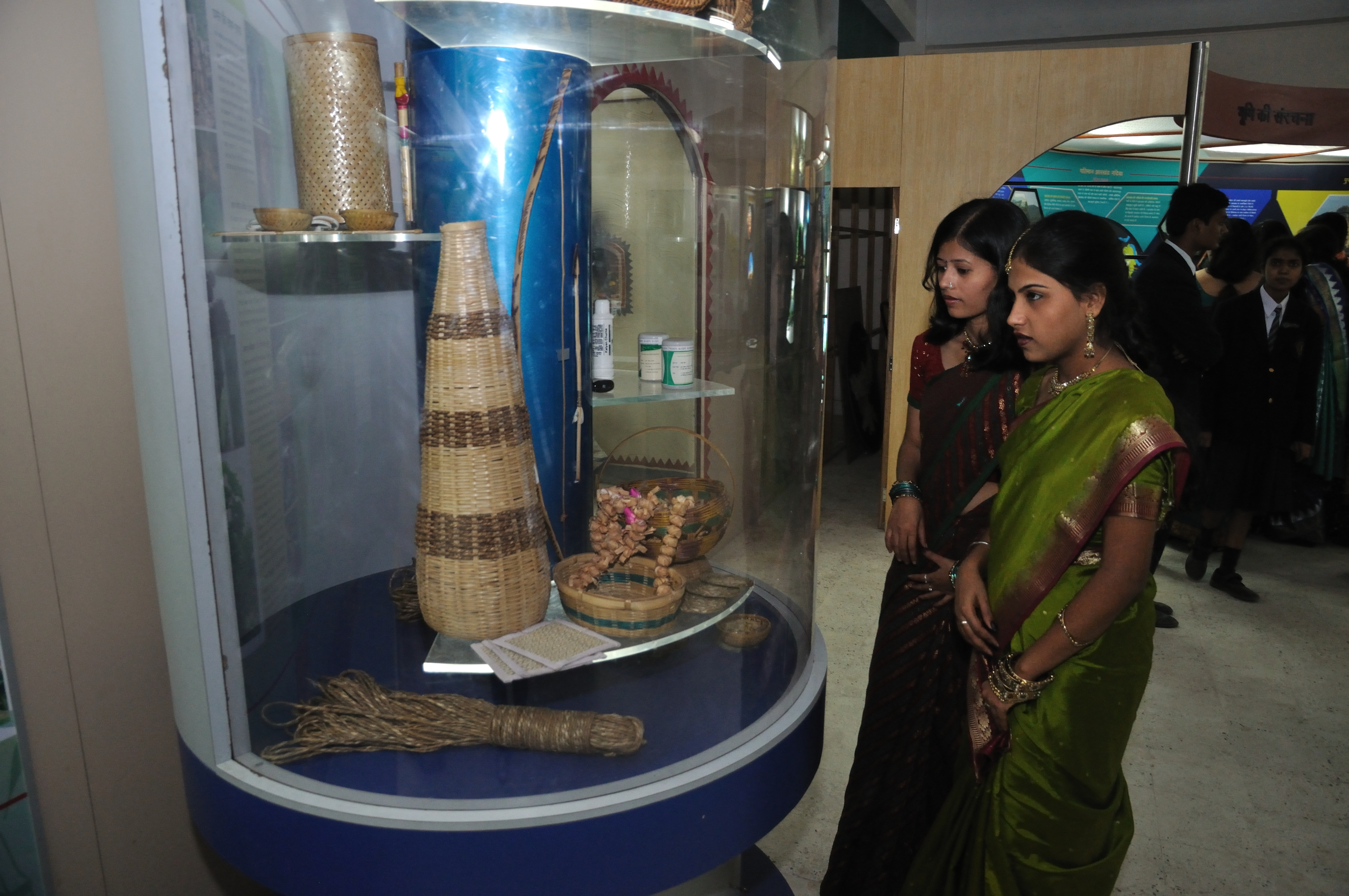
Resources of Jharkhand - Ranchi Science Centre

== Galleries ==
- Fun Science
- How Things Work
- Wealth of Jharkhand

== Science Park ==
In 8 acre area, there are several interactive exhibits on simple machines, sound, optics, pendulum and static models of prehistoric animals.

== Other facilities ==
- 3D projection theater
- Auditorium
- Car park
- Children's corner
- Computer hall
- Conference room
- Exhibit development laboratory
- Office
- Science demonstration corner
- Science library
- Store
- Taramandal or Inflatable dome portable planetarium
- Temporary exhibition hall

== See also ==
- List of science centers#Asia
