= Scientific Centre of Monaco =

Public institution conducting scientific research

The Scientific Centre of Monaco (French: Centre Scientifique de Monaco, CSM) is a public establishment providing the Principality of Monaco with means to conduct scientific research. CSM is specialized in the study of corals and coral reefs, as well as fight against cancer in partnership with the Flavien Foundation. CSM is grouped into three departments aimed at studying the functioning of organisms in order to acquire better understanding, foresee the effects of environmental stress (Physiology of Conservation) or discover therapeutic treatments (Translational Biology). CSM is headed by Patrick Rampal.

== History ==
The CSM was founded in 1960 by Rainier III, Prince of Monaco in order to provide the Principality with the means to conduct scientific research. Additionally, the CSM was aimed to support activities of governmental organizations and international agencies aimed at protection and conservation of marine life.

Since its foundation till 1990, the CSM monitored the radioactivity of the atmosphere and traced major ocean currents. In the late 1980s the CSM's first department was founded – Department of Marine Biology, specializing in the study of corals. In 1990, after a major restructuring the CSM environmental monitoring activities were transferred to a State service.

Since 2009, the CSM is also developing biomedical research activities. In 2010, the second department of the CSM was founded – Department of Polar Biology, created as a part of an international associated laboratory. Starting from this year, the CSM, under the leadership of the Prince Albert II, has become a multidisciplinary research institute integrating environmental economics, a Department of Polar Biology and the Department of Medical Biology - officially opened at the behest of Prince Albert II in 2013.

In 2014, the CSM started to collaborate with startup Coraliotech conducting joint research in the field of genetic diseases and DNA sequencing of corals with the Departments of Marine Biology and Medical Biology. In January 2021, the CSM acquired a stake in Coraliotech, becoming the first Monegasque public institution to hold a stake in a private company.

In March 2017, the CSM signed a partnership agreement with the Oceanographic Institute. The CSM is also affiliated with Biodiversity and Environments Sensitive to Climate Change (BioSensib), Monaco.

In 2020, the CSM celebrated its 60th anniversary, however due to the health crisis the occasion was not celebrated publicly.

== Missions ==
The missions of the CSM are defined as following:

- To develop knowledge in all areas of science, especially those that are traditional for the Principality of Monaco;
- To disseminate information, as well as scientific and technical knowledge;
- To conduct scientific trainings and research management;
- To develop scientific expertise.

== Departments ==
=== Department of Marine Biology ===
The Department of Marine Biology was created in early 1990s and specializes in the study of corals and coral reefs and includes two teams, the Physiology and Biochemistry Team and the Ecophysiology and Ecology Team.

=== Department of Polar Biology ===
The Department of Polar Biology was created in 2010 as part of an Associated International Laboratory (LIA BioSensib 647 - CSM - CNRS - Univ. De Strasbourg). The department provides scientific basis for the use of penguins as an indicator of changes in the polar ecosystems.

=== Department of Medical Biology ===
The Department of Medical Biology was officially opened in 2013. The department brings together several teams. The general objective of this department is to increase general knowledge about serious or incurable pathologies, in particular certain pediatric cancers or Duchenne muscular dystrophy.

== See also ==
- List of science centers
