= Techniquest =

Science and discovery centre in Cardiff Bay

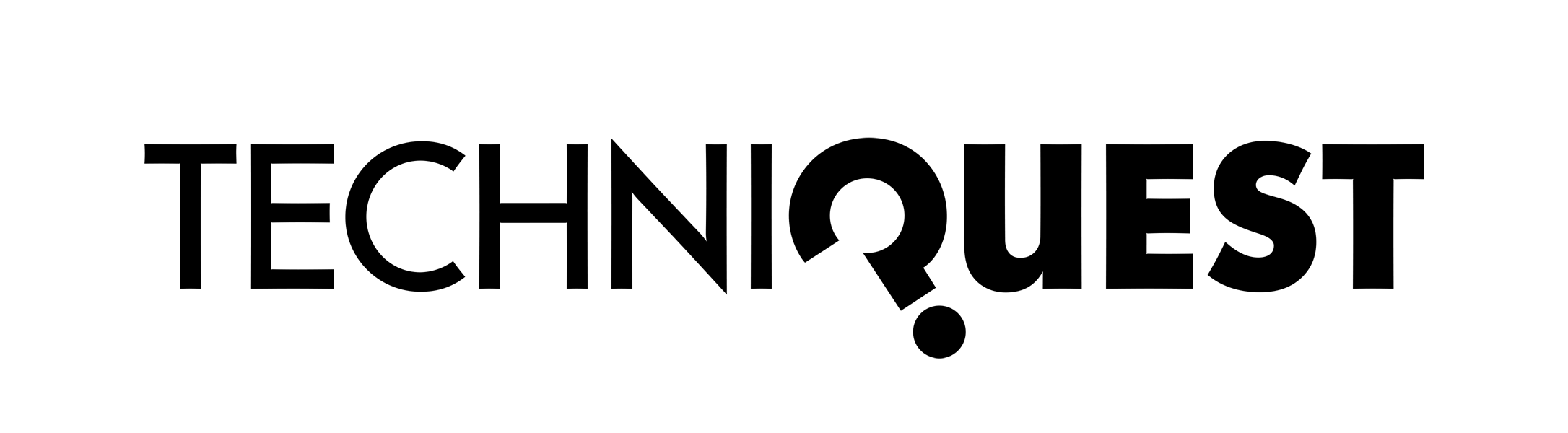

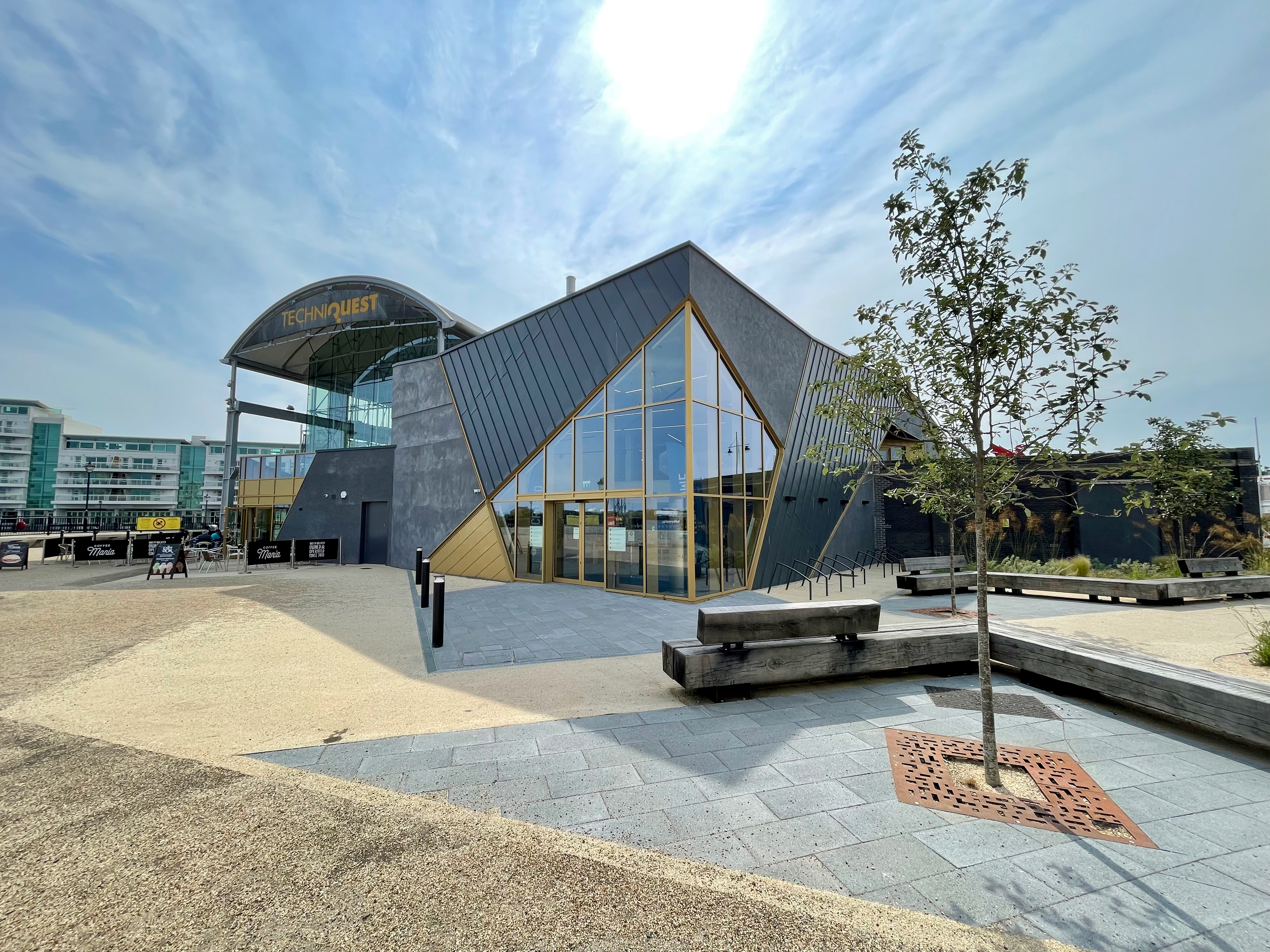
- Established: 1986
- Location: Cardiff Bay, Cardiff, Wales
- Coordinates: 51.4629°N 3.1677°W
- Public transit access: Cardiff Bay; Cardiff Bus 6 (Baycar), 8, 13
- Website: Techniquest website

Techniquest is a science discovery centre located in Cardiff Bay, Wales. It gives visitors a hands-on approach to science and includes a science theatre, a planetarium, and an exhibition space with over 100 interactive exhibits aimed at visitors of all ages.

Techniquest was founded in 1986 by Professor John Beetlestone (1932–2016) and his colleagues from Cardiff University. It previously had a sister venue located in Wrexham, along with locations in Llanberis in Gwynedd, and the Adventure Centre in Narberth, Pembrokeshire.

== History of the Cardiff site ==
Techniquest first opened on 13 November 1986 on the site of the old British Gas showroom on the corner of Duke Street and St John Street. There were 48 exhibits at that time, many of them were designed and built by Techniquest. The former showroom housed the centre for around nine months. Less than seven weeks after it had opened Techniquest had welcomed its ten thousandth visitor.

In 1988 Techniquest re-opened in a pre-fabricated building opposite the now demolished Welsh Industrial and Maritime Museum in Bute Street. The two buildings were removed to make way for Mermaid Quay.

They moved again in 1995 about 100 metres along Stuart Street to its present location on the site of the former Baileys engineering workshop which is now its permanent headquarters. The building, the UK's first purpose-built science discovery centre, opened on 1 May 1995. It uses the steel framework of the original building which can be clearly seen on the photograph.

It was once filmed for an episode for the third series of CBBC children's drama programme, The Story of Tracy Beaker.

== Activities ==
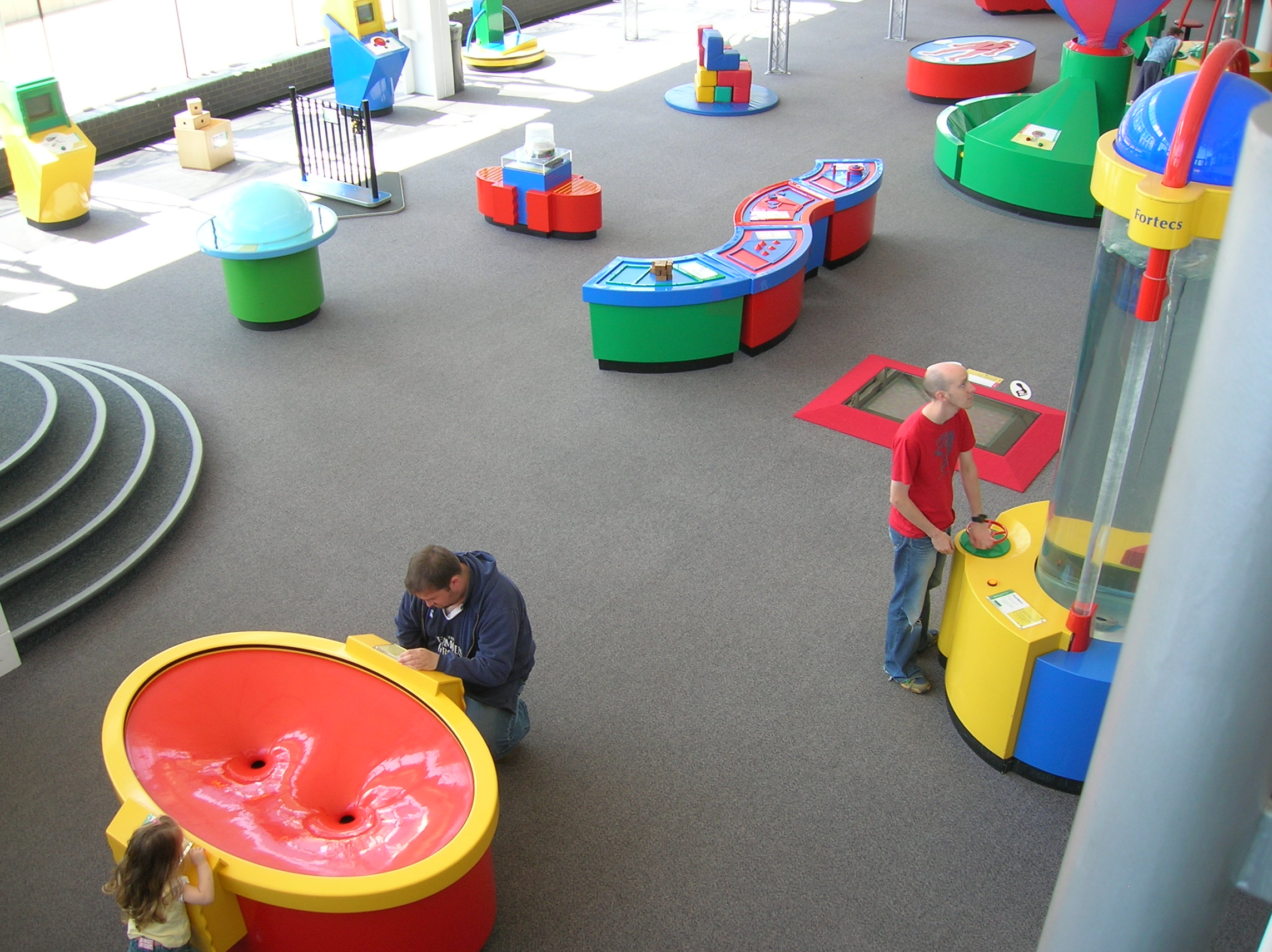
Inside Techniquest, Cardiff Bay

Its aims are to engage people with science and to motivate them to learn more; they also address science-related areas such as mathematics, engineering and technology. Techniquest operates exhibitions, shows and programmes intended to make science accessible to people throughout Wales, and to improve the quality of public debate about science and technology. It also offers comprehensive education services to schools and teachers, to complement formal education provision in Wales.

Historically, Techniquest took exhibitions and programmes to special events at many venues around Wales, from shopping centres to major cultural events such as the National Eisteddfod, in addition to further activities through schemes such as Wales Gene Park, mathcymru, Science Café Wales and Teacher Science Network.

To provide this range of experiences, Techniquest maintained an Active Design and development arm, with workshops and facilities, which closed in 2019. It still works with a range of partners and other experts, which included academics, scientists, industry and government, both within Wales and internationally.

In recent times the amount of such outreach work has reduced but the space itself has expanded, thanks to the development of the Science Capital, which has increased the area of the centre by over 60%. The range of exhibits now includes many aimed at older children in addition to many old favourites being retained in the original setting. In order to reach more people across a wider geographical area, Techniquest also now produces digital shows that can be used in classrooms across the whole of Wales.

== Funding ==
As an independent registered educational charity, Techniquest is funded from a variety of sources. Until 2016, the Welsh Government provided approximately 1/3 of the funding, particularly to support schools programmes; at which point this funding was gradually reduced each year. Admission charges are now key to helping meet operating costs, whilst grants and other earned income are also essential to support much of the education and outreach work.

== See also ==
- List of science centers
