= Istanbul Technical University Science Center =

Science center in Taksim, Istanbul, Turkey

Istanbul Technical University's Science Center, located in Taskisla campus in the district of Taksim, Istanbul, is a center which encourages children to interact with exhibits. It opened in November 2007. The exhibition contains exhibits related to mechanics, electricity and magnetism, mathematics, dna, space and general physics.
