= Gilles Freyer =

French professor, oncologist and medical professional

Gilles Freyer is a French professor, oncologist and medical professional who has specialised in the field of gynaecological cancers. He is currently head of the Department of Medical Oncology and Vice-Dean of the University of Lyon. He is also the current Medical Director of the Cancer Institute of the Hospices Civils de Lyon. He is known for having been the President of the cooperative group GINECO (Groupe d'Investigateurs National des Etudes des Cancers Ovariens et du sein) from 2013. He was also a member of the International Scientific Committee of INCa (French National Cancer Institute). Professor Freyer is also known for being the President of the Monaco Age Oncologie and the Co-President of the Biennale Monégasque de Cancérologie.

== Education ==
Freyer obtained his MD in 1994 and specialised in medical oncology the following year. He then obtained a degree in clinical pharmacology and psychophysiology at the University of Lyon I in 1995-96. In 1996, he obtained a master's degree in human biology from the same University. He also specialised in bioethics at the University of Paris in 1997. He obtained his PhD in Population Pharmacokinetics in 2000 at the University of Lyon.

== Significant Academic Publications ==
- Glehen, O.; Osinsky, D.; Cotte, E.; Kwiatkowski, F.; Freyer, G.; Isaac, S.; Trillet-Lenoir, V.; Sayag-Beaujard, A. C.; François, Y.; Vignal, J.; Gilly, F. N. (2003). "Intraperitoneal Chemohyperthermia Using a Closed Abdominal Procedure and Cytoreductive Surgery for the Treatment of Peritoneal Carcinomatosis: Morbidity and Mortality Analysis of 216 Consecutive Procedures". Annals of Surgical Oncology. 10 (8): 863–869. doi:10.1245/ASO.2003.01.018. PMID 14527903. S2CID 13227094.
- Glehen, O.; Mithieux, F.; Osinsky, D.; Beaujard, A.C.; Freyer, G.; Guertsch, Ph.; Francois, Y.; Peyrat, P.; Panteix, G.; Vignal, J.; Gilly, F.N. (2003). "Surgery Combined with Peritonectomy Procedures and Intraperitoneal Chemohyperthermia in Abdominal Cancers with Peritoneal Carcinomatosis: A Phase II Study". Journal of Clinical Oncology. 21 (5): 799–806. doi:10.1200/JCO.2003.06.139. PMID 12610177.
- González-Martín, Antonio; Pothuri, Bhavana; Vergote, Ignace; Depont Christensen, René; Graybill, Whitney; Mirza, Mansoor R.; McCormick, Colleen; Lorusso, Domenica; Hoskins, Paul; Freyer, Gilles; Baumann, Klaus; Jardon, Kris; Redondo, Andrés; Moore, Richard G.; Vulsteke, Christof; o'Cearbhaill, Roisin E.; Lund, Bente; Backes, Floor; Barretina-Ginesta, Pilar; Haggerty, Ashley F.; Rubio-Pérez, Maria J.; Shahin, Mark S.; Mangili, Giorgia; Bradley, William H.; Bruchim, Ilan; Sun, Kaiming; Malinowska, Izabela A.; Li, Yong; Gupta, Divya; et al. (2019). "Niraparib in Patients with Newly Diagnosed Advanced Ovarian Cancer". New England Journal of Medicine. 381 (25): 2391–2402. doi:10.1056/NEJMoa1910962. hdl:2437/273938. PMID 31562799.
- Glehen, O.; Schreiber, V.; Cotte, E.; Sayag-Beaujard, A. C.; Osinsky, D.; Freyer, G.; François, Y.; Vignal, J.; Gilly, F. N. (2004). "Cytoreductive Surgery and Intraperitoneal Chemohyperthermia for Peritoneal Carcinomatosis Arising from Gastric Cancer". Archives of Surgery. 139 (1): 20–6. doi:10.1001/archsurg.139.1.20. PMID 14718269.
- Gérard, Jean-Pierre; Chapet, Olivier; Nemoz, Chantal; Romestaing, Pascale; Mornex, Françoise; Coquard, Régis; Barbet, Nicolas; Atlan, Dan; Adeleine, Patrice; Freyer, Gilles (2003). "Preoperative Concurrent Chemoradiotherapy in Locally Advanced Rectal Cancer with High-Dose Radiation and Oxaliplatin-Containing Regimen: The Lyon R0–04 Phase II Trial". Journal of Clinical Oncology. 21 (6): 1119–1124. doi:10.1200/JCO.2003.10.045. PMID 12637479.
- Blay, J. Y.; Chauvin, F.; Le Cesne, A.; Anglaret, B.; Bouhour, D.; Lasset, C.; Freyer, G.; Philip, T.; Biron, P. (1996). "Early lymphopenia after cytotoxic chemotherapy as a risk factor for febrile neutropenia". Journal of Clinical Oncology. 14 (2): 636–643. doi:10.1200/JCO.1996.14.2.636. PMID 8636781.
- Kouroukis, C. Tom; Belch, Andrew; Crump, Michael; Eisenhauer, Elizabeth; Gascoyne, Randy D.; Meyer, Ralph; Lohmann, Reinhard; Lopez, Pedro; Powers, Jean; Turner, Robert; Connors, Joseph M.; National Cancer Institute of Canada Clinical Trials Group (2003). "Flavopiridol in Untreated or Relapsed Mantle-Cell Lymphoma: Results of a Phase II Study of the National Cancer Institute of Canada Clinical Trials Group". Journal of Clinical Oncology. 21 (9): 1740–1745. doi:10.1200/jco.2003.09.057. PMID 12735303.
- Freyer, Gilles; Campone, Mario; Peron, Julien; Facchini, Thomas; Terret, Catherine; Berdah, Jean-François; Jacquin, Jean-Philippe; Coeffic, David; Hilaire, Pierre de Saint; Falandry, Claire (2011). "Adjuvant docetaxel/Cyclophosphamide in breast cancer patients over the age of 70: Results of an observational study". Critical Reviews in Oncology/Hematology. 80 (3): 466–473. doi:10.1016/j.critrevonc.2011.04.001. PMID 21565521.

== Books authored ==
- Ovarian Cancer in Elderly Patients. Germany: Springer International Publishing, 2015. ISBN 9783319235882
- Freyer, Gilles. Faire face au cancer: L’espoir au quotidien. France: Editions Odile Jacob, 2008. ISBN 9782738120922
- Freyer, Gilles. Dénoncer et bannir: ou L'Obscurantisme progressiste. France: Jacques André éditeur, 2019.
- Freyer, Gilles. Sciences humaines et sociales en médecine et pharmacie. France: Ellipses, 2009.
