= The Green Connection =

Green Connection
- Interactive map of Green Connection
- 5.977689°N 116.088077°E
- Date opened: May 2010
- Location: Kota Kinabalu, Sabah, Malaysia
- No. of species: 1200
- Volume of largest tank: 450,000 litres (120,000 US gal)
- Total volume of tanks: 650,000 litres (170,000 US gal)
- Website: www.greenconnectionkk.com

The Green Connection is an aquarium and science discovery center in Kota Kinabalu, Sabah, Malaysia. It opened in May 2010 and is located outside downtown Kota Kinabalu in the Northwest corner of the island of Borneo.

== History ==
In 2005, Prof. Steve Oakley—a marine biologist at the University Malaysia Sarawak's (Unimas) Institute of Biodiversity and Environmental Conservation—was working with a team of scientists to rejuvenate coral reefs and rescue marine life. Oakley then partnered with the Sabah Foundation (YS) to develop the land into an aquarium. It is now the major shareholder in Aquatica Aquarium and Discovery Centre Sdn Bhd, which owns the Green Connection.

The aquarium finished construction and opened its doors to the public in 2010. It encompasses a nearly 1-hectare (2.5-acre) area of previously undeveloped swampland.

== Exhibits ==
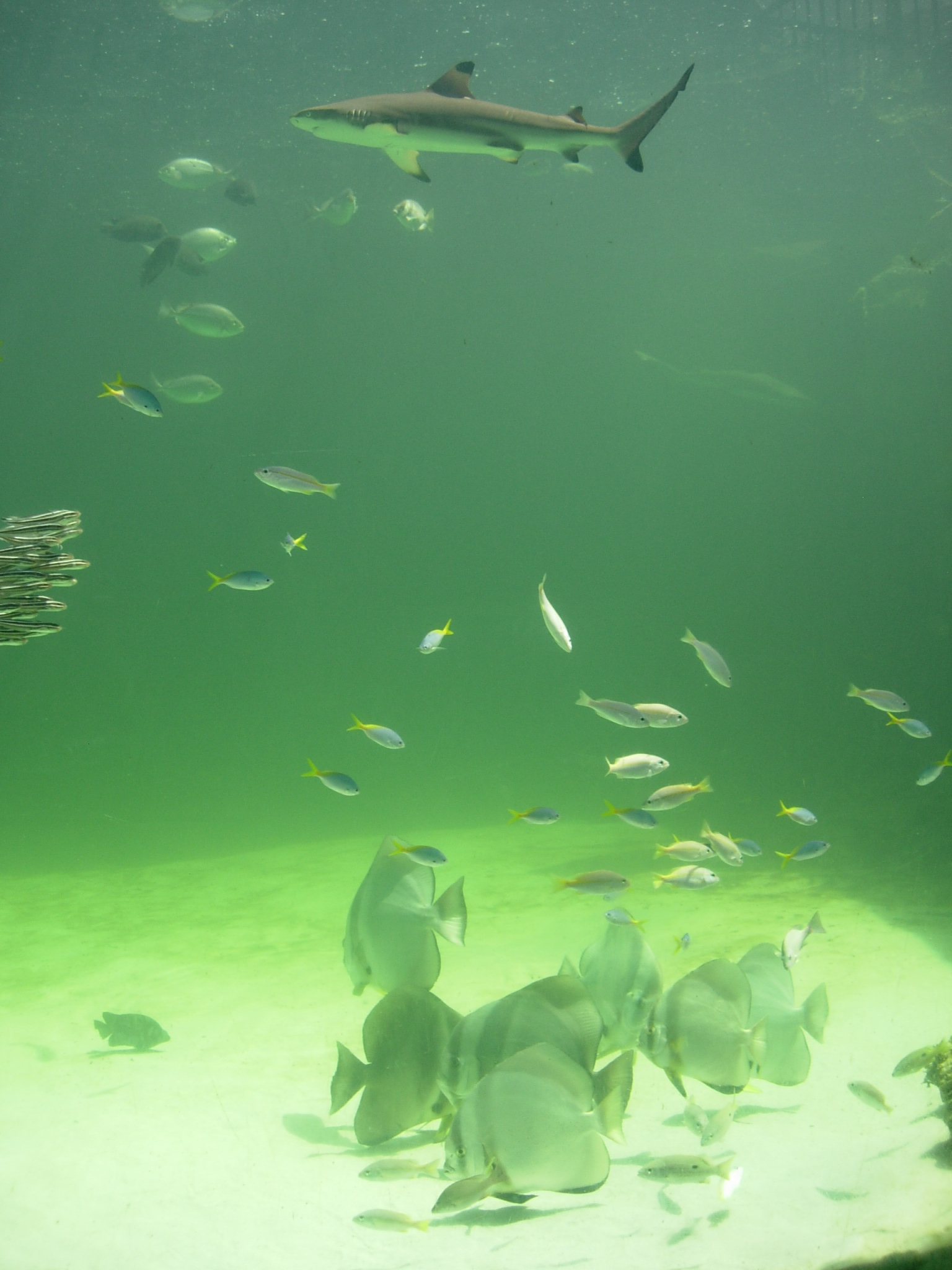
The KK coral reef Tank

The Green Connection showcases Borneo's biodiversity with displays of over 1200 species of wildlife from seven ecosystems and has interactive exhibits incorporating many aspects of aquatic science. It has 650,000 litres (170,000 US gal) of recirculating water and exhibits 12,500 plants and animals representing 670 species. The facility also houses a 4-metre (13 ft) high 450,000-litre (120,000 US gal) tank for viewing coral reef marine life, where typical reef life is grown using natural sunlight. Another display is home to one of the world's most deadly snakes, the banded sea krait Laticauda Colubrina.

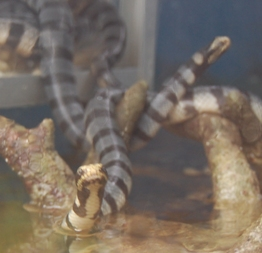
Banded sea krait

The Green Connection is arranged as an introduction to the Sabah's ecosystem. Visitors walk through limestone caves, dense jungles, muddy mangroves, and reefs, and out into the open ocean where coral reefs grow.

== Education ==
The center includes interactive exhibits on water and ocean science to life. School visits follow the Malaysian Curriculum and usually focus on environmental education and conservation issues. When visitors first arrive at Sabah, the aquarium introduces the wildlife they will see throughout their visit.

== Sustainability and conservation ==
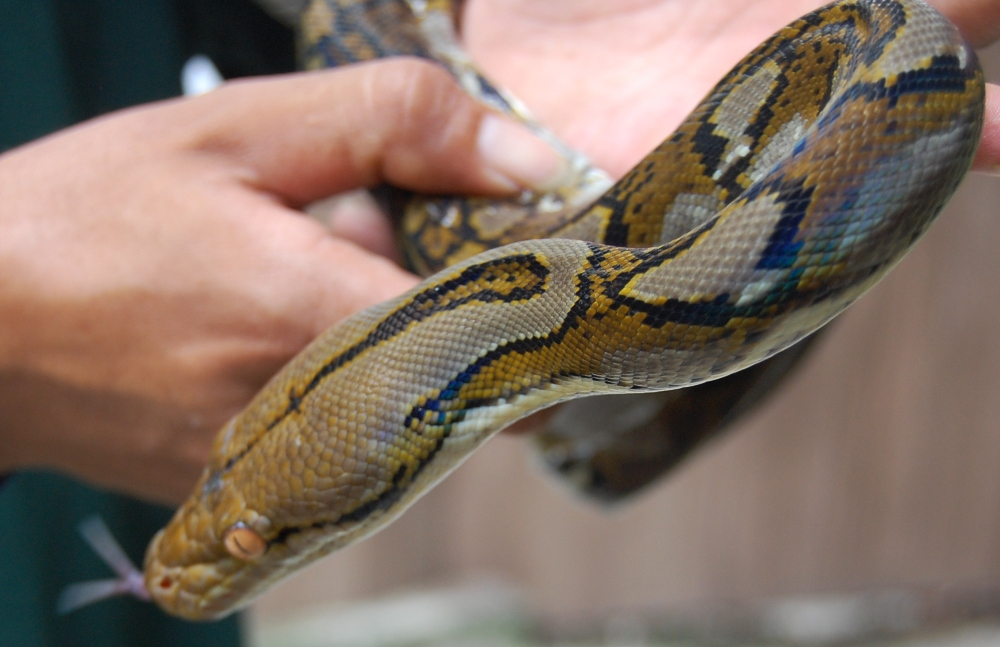
Reticulated python

The Green Connection advertises its aim to promote marine conservation and environmental awareness. It has many snakes bred in captivity from wild-caught parents purchased from hunters. The wild-caught snakes are frequently damaged and require care and treatment for injuries. After treatment for males or after egg laying for females, the wild snakes are released back to the national parks of Sabah. All the snakes on public display were raised from eggs and handled daily, the snakes are used in rotation to avoid visitors' excessive handling. The center also has a turtle rescue center where sick, injured, or juvenile turtles can be cared for before being released back into the wild.

All the fish are purchased from fishers. The giant coral reef tank has 17 tons of artificial rock, 35 tons of sand, and 450,000 litres (120,000 US gal) of water. The corals for the aquarium were planted between 2005 and 2007 on several nursery sites on the degraded reef. The coral nubbins came from coral fragments recovered from bomb fishing blast sites. A total of 6500 coral blocks were planted, and more than 10,000 faux rock blocks: some were overturned by fish, and the corals smothered, and some grew so fast that they have become part of the reef at the nursery site, some have been moved to the Green Connection, and the nursery corals have been thinned, and moved apart with the excess corals replanted back on degraded reefs. The project has expanded, and anyone can plant corals to help reefs recover.

The Green Connection was designed to be off-grid except for its drinking water. The foundation was built to double as a water storage tank holding up to 75,000 litres (20,000 US gal) of rainwater. All gray water is recycled after being filtered through on-site reed beds.
