= Tom Tits Experiment =

Museum in Sweden

Coordinates: 59.2003°N 17.6232°E

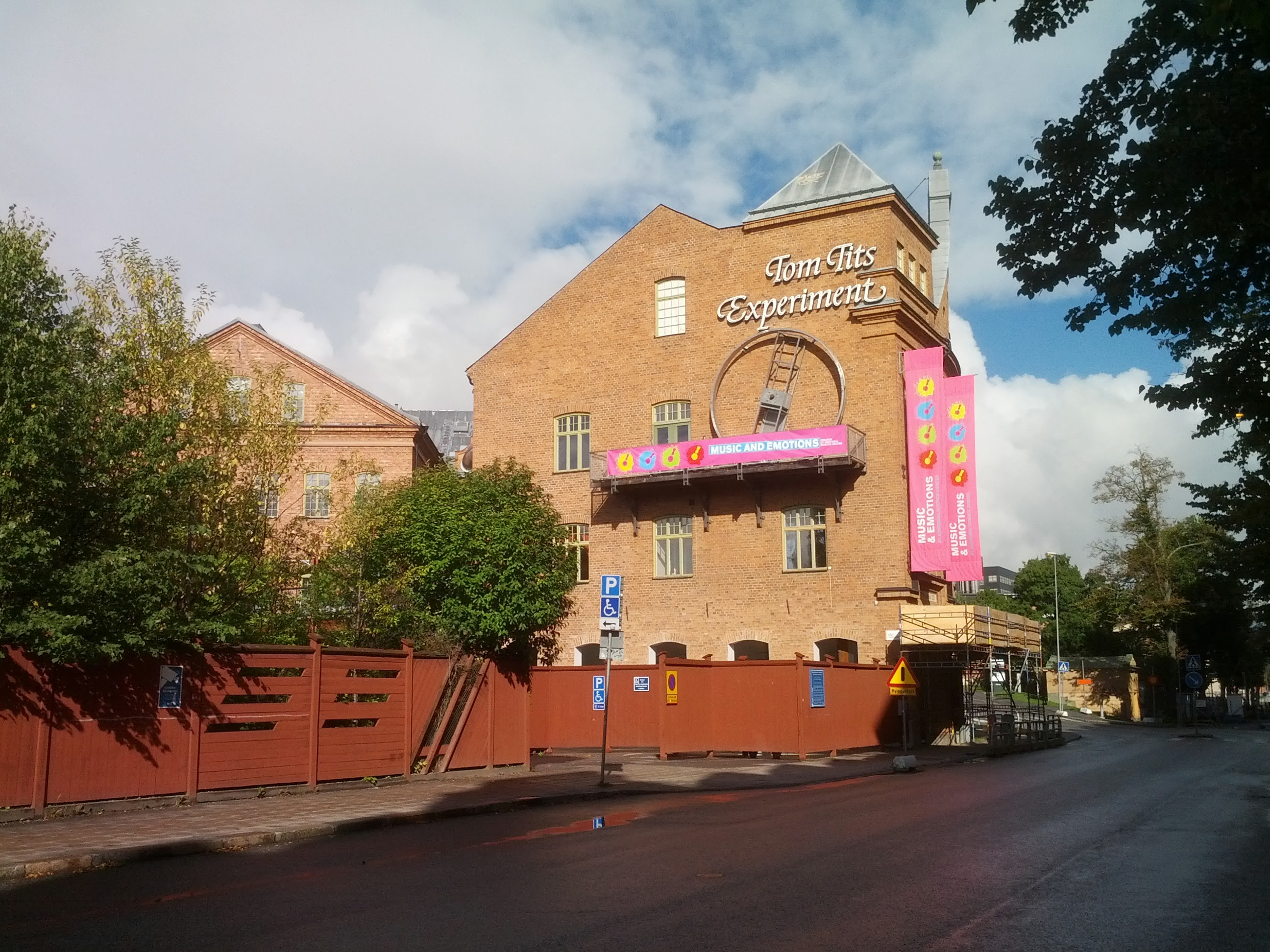
Tom Tits Experiment

Tom Tits Experiment is a science centre and preschool located in the municipality of Södertälje in Stockholm County, Sweden. It calls itself "Swedens first and largest science centre". The centre opened in 1987, with the preschool opening in 2004.

== History ==
The centre started as a temporary exhibition in the Södertälje Art Hall in 1987. Two years later, a permanent exhibition was opened in its current premises, which were previously used for industrial purposes by the company Alfa Laval, who manufactured centrifuges. The name Tom Tit comes from the French book Tom Tit – La Science Amusante by Arthur Good, published in 1898, which contains various experiments originally published in French magazine L'Illustration under the pseudonym Tom Tit.

Tom Tits Experiment comprises an area of over 15,000 square metres and has exhibitions and experiments on the themes of technology, physics, mathematics, natural geography, biology, and optical illusions. The museum spans four floors, and also has a large outdoor area. In total, the facility has over 400 experiments.

In 2006 Tom Tits Experiment was awarded the Luigi Micheletti Award, a prestigious prize (under the auspices of the Council of Europe) for museums with a focus on contemporary history, science and the industrial and social cultural heritage of Europe.

In addition to the museum, the centre runs a preschool facility, which accommodates 60 children between the ages of two and five years old. The school was opened in 2004.
