= Science City =

Science City may refer to:

== Cities ==
- Muñoz, Nueva Ecija, officially Science City of Muñoz since 2000, Philippines
- Kansai Science City, Japan

== Campuses and research centers ==
- Science City Chennai, Chennai, India
- Science City, Kolkata, a national science center in Kolkata, West Bengal, India
  - includes the Science City Auditorium, part of an attached convention center
- Guangzhou Science City, a technology center in Guangzhou, China
- Gujarat Science City, an education center in Ahmedabad, Gujarat, India
- Pushpa Gujral Science City, Kapurthala, an educational science center in Kapurthala, Punjab, India
- Dr. A. P. J. Abdul Kalam Science City, India

== Other uses ==
- Science City station (disambiguation)
- Science City at Union Station, a science museum in Kansas City, Missouri, United States
- Science City Jena, a basketball team in Jena, Germany
- Canada South Science City, a science museum in Windsor, Ontario, Canada
- ETH Zurich#Hönggerberg campus, a sustainability project in Switzerland

== See also ==
- City of Science and Industry, a science museum in Paris, France
- City of Arts and Sciences, a cultural and architectural complex in Valencia, Spain
- Masdar City (literally "Source City"), a planned city in Abu Dhabi
- Stifterverband für die Deutsche Wissenschaft, an organization that awards "City of Science" designations in Germany
- Naukograd, the Soviet designation of certain cities
