= Mayandi Bharathi =

- Born: Mayandi; 1917; Melamasi Street, Madurai, British India
- Died: 24 February 2015(age 97-98)
- Occupation: Journalist
- Known for: Indian independence movement
- Spouse: Ponnammal

Mayandi Bharathi (1917–2015) was an Indian journalist and revolutionary who participated in the independence movement. He was born on 1917 in Madurai, India. He was in various post in cpim for a long time and Gandhian philosophy. He was the president of the Chennai Province Extremist Youth Wing. He went to prison 13 times during 1942, 1943 and 1944 for participating in the Quit India Movement and a double-lifer in the Tirunelveli conspiracy case in which he was later acquitted. He worked as an editor on various communist print media like Janasakthi, Theekathir. he was one of the first persons to congratulate U Sagayam, IAS officer, when he returned to Madurai to investigate the multi-crore granite scam.
