= Granite scam in Tamil Nadu =

Indian corruption scandal

The granite scam was a corruption scandal that occurred in Tamil Nadu, India. It gained notoriety after former civil servant of Madurai Ubagarampillai Sagayam wrote a letter to the chief secretary of the State Industries Department on 19 May 2012, reporting major violations by many granite quarries in the Madurai district, estimating a loss of more than sixteen thousand crore rupees (~US$2.5 billion) to the state exchequer.

Some officials of the state-owned Tamil Nadu Minerals Limited (TAMIN) were accused of colluding with companies such as Mojang, allowing them to commit violations.

== Investigation ==
Eighteen teams of officers created by the Madurai Collector, Anshul Mishra, started inspections on 2 August 2012, covering 175 quarries in the district. Later, P. R. Palanisamy of PRP Exports and Panneer Mohamed (owner of Madura Granites in Melur) surrendered to the police. The state government suspended nine people, including a tehsildar and deputy tehsildar in Madurai. A senior clerk of Tamil Nadu Minerals Limited (TAMIN) was arrested. A representation made by Mishra to the chief secretary Debendranath Sarangi sought an inquiry by the Directorate of Vigilance and Anti-Corruption (DVAC) into the roles of public servants in this scandal. After this exposure, the Tamil Nadu Government, worked with the Income Tax Department to carry out raids on other quarries across the state.

The initial report sent by the Madurai collector at that time, Sagayam, placed the losses to the State government at 16,000 crore rupees. Some of the RTI (Right to Information) activists claimed that the losses could be estimated at around 1 lakh crore rupees.

== Accused ==
P. R. Palanisamy, owner of PRP Exports and a billionaire with political connections, was arrested and his company sealed. Olympus Granites, allegedly owned by Durai Dayanidhi, son of former Union Minister of Chemicals, M. K. Azhagiri, was also accused of illegal quarrying. The report submitted by U. Sagayam stated that 84 private quarries had violated license conditions and taken part in illegal mining.

Palanichamy (age 60), his sons P. Senthil Kumar (37) and P. Suresh Kumar (31) and son-in-law A. Maharajan (25) filed anticipatory bail applications with the Madurai bench of the Madras high court apprehending arrest in a case registered by the Keelavalavu police station. Dayanidhi Azhagiri also filed an anticipatory bail petition with the high court bench. After anticipatory bail was granted, Azhagiri surrendered before Melur court on 14 December 2012.

== Chronology of events ==
2012

- 1 September: Raid of Geology and Mines Department office at the collectorate in Madurai by the Directorate of Vigilance and Anti-Corruption officials.
- 2 September: Tamil Nadu police arrest four senior Government officers in connection with the scam.
- 8 August: Police raid 12 granite firms and 23 people holding supervisory positions in those firms have been arrested. Of the 23 held, 14 are from PRP Exports, 3 from Sindhu Granites, 2 from GG Granites and 4 from Madura Granites.

2014

- 11 September: The Madras High Court appoints U. Sagayam as a Special Officer/Legal Commissioner to inspect various types of mining activities in the State and submit a report to the court within two months.

2015

- 23 November: Sagayam submits his report to the Madras High Court, estimating a revenue loss of Rs 65,154.60 crore.

== See also ==
- People from Madurai
