= Melur R. Samy =

Indian politician (died 2018)

Periyapullan P. Selvam

Member of the Tamil Nadu Legislative Assembly
- In office 14 May 2001 – 19 May 2016
- Preceded by: K. V. V. Rajamanickam
- Succeeded by: Periyapullan @ P. Selvam
- Constituency: Melur

Personal details
- Citizenship: Indian
- Party: All India Anna Dravida Munnetra Kazhagam (until 2017)
- Other political affiliations: Amma Makkal Munnetra Kazhagam (2017-18)

R. Samy (died 10 May 2018) popularly known as Melur Sami was an Indian politician and former member of the Tamil Nadu Legislative Assembly from the Melur constituency. As a cadre of All India Anna Dravida Munnetra Kazhagam party he represented the same Melur constituency in the 2001, 2006 and 2011 elections. He was one of the founding leaders of Amma Makkal Munnetra Kazhagam.
