= Senthi Udayanathapuram =

Senthi Udayanathapuram சேந்தி உடையநாதபுரம்
- Village
- Interactive map of Senthi Udayanathapuram
- Coordinates: 9.865671°N 78.404040°E
- Country: India
- State: Tamil Nadu
- District: Sivaganga District
- Time zone: +5.30GMT
- PIN: 630562

Senthi Udayanathapuram (also spelled Senthiudayanathapuram) is a village in the Sivaganga district in the Indian state of Tamil Nadu. The village is known for its graphite mineral resources and graphite mines operated by Tamil Nadu Minerals (TAMIN), a state-owned by mining company. Senthi Udayanathapuram is located near several state highways, providing seamless connectivity to major national highways.

== Location ==
Senthi Udayanathapuram is located approximately 11 km from the city of Sivaganga and about 470 km from Chennai, the capital of Tamil Nadu. The nearest airport is Madurai International Airport, approximately 44 km via National Highway 85. The nearest railway station is Sivaganga Railway Station which is located around 14 km from the village.

The village is situated within approximately 30 minutes by road from Keeladi Archaeological site and Keeladi Open-Air museum. Madurai Meenakshi Amman Temple is 37 km from this village.

== Graphite mineral deposits ==
Senthiudayanathapuram and its surrounding regions contain mineral deposits including graphite, gypsum and other industrial minerals. Tamil Nadu Minerals Ltd (TAMIN), owned by Government of Tamil Nadu, operates mining in these area covering more than 600 acres of including Senthiudayanathapuram, and its neighbouring regions Pudupatti and Kumaripatti.

The graphite from Sivaganga has a flaky texture and an average fixed carbon content of 14%. After processing it is used for refractory bricks, crucibles, carbon brushes, lubricants, and pencils and other industrial applications.

TAMIN operates beneficiation plant in Senthiudaynathapuram, which has been in operation since 1994. The plant has capacity to processes 200 tonnes of ore each day and produces around 20 tonnes of high-quality graite daily. It is estimated that reserve of graphite ore in leasehold area is three million tonnes.

== Controversies ==
The Union ministry for environment, forest and climate change has imposed a penalty on State-owned Tamil Nadu Minerals Limited (TAMIN) for alleged environmental compliance violations related to graphite mining in Sivaganga district. TAMIN subsequently challenged the issues and took necessary steps to address the compliance issues.

== See also ==
- Tamil Nadu Minerals Limited
- Keeladi
- Keezhadi excavation site
- Graphite
