= Keelavalavu =

Neighbourhood in Madurai district, Tamil Nadu, India

Keellhavalavu
- Neighbourhood
- Country: India
- State: Tamil Nadu
- District: Madurai

Languages
  - Official: Tamil, English
  - Speech: Tamil, English
- Time zone: UTC+5:30 (IST)

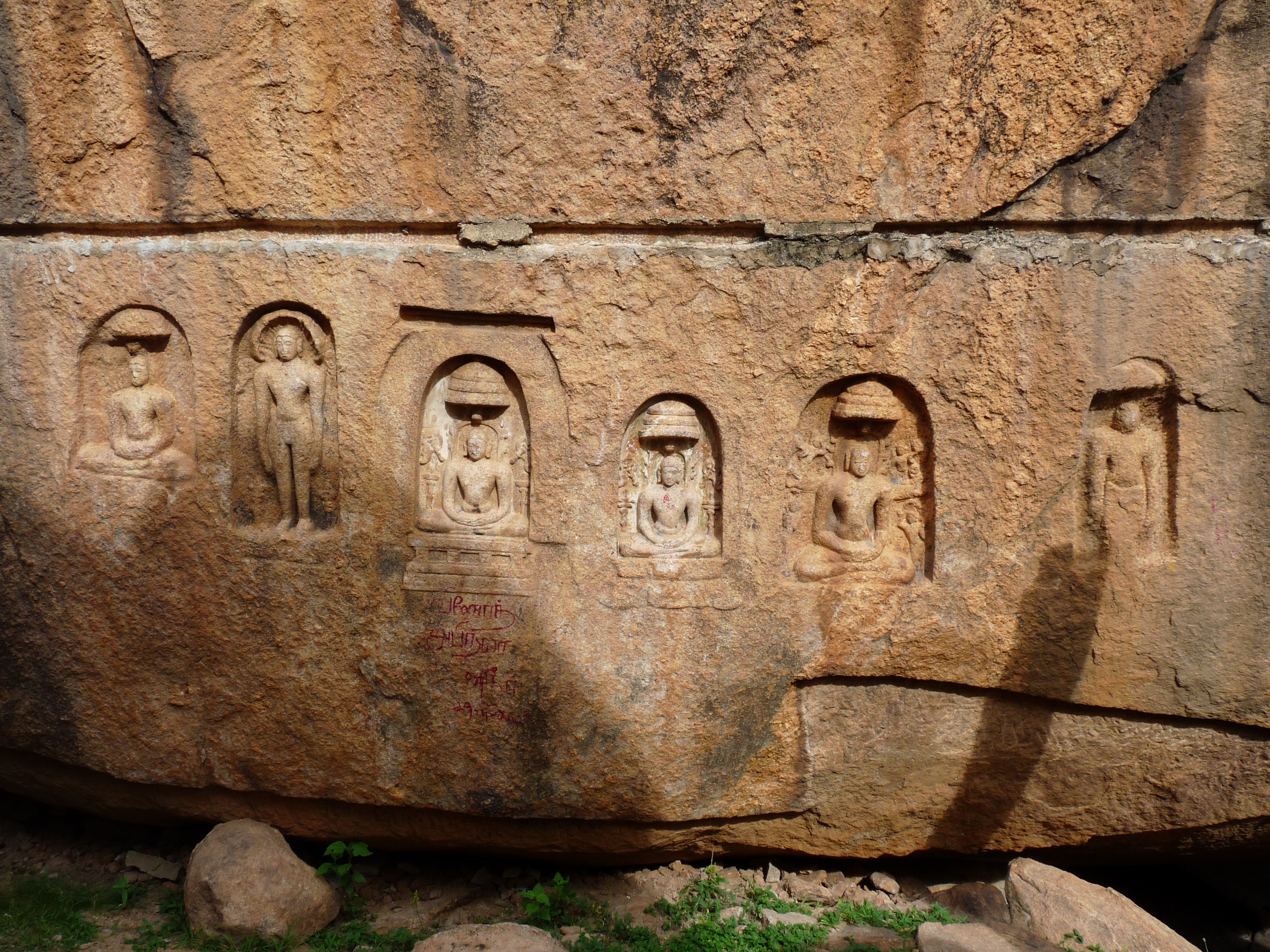
Kizhavalavu Jain Sculptures

Keezhavazhavu (also known as Kilavalavu and Keelavalavu and Kizhavalavu) is a village in Madurai district of Tamil Nadu, India. It is located 43 kilometres (27 mi) from Madurai. It is known for two hillocks called Panchapandavar Malai or Panchapandavar Padukkai which contains ancient Jain sculptures and stone beds, and another is Sakkarai peer oliulla Mountain. It has a cave.

== Description ==
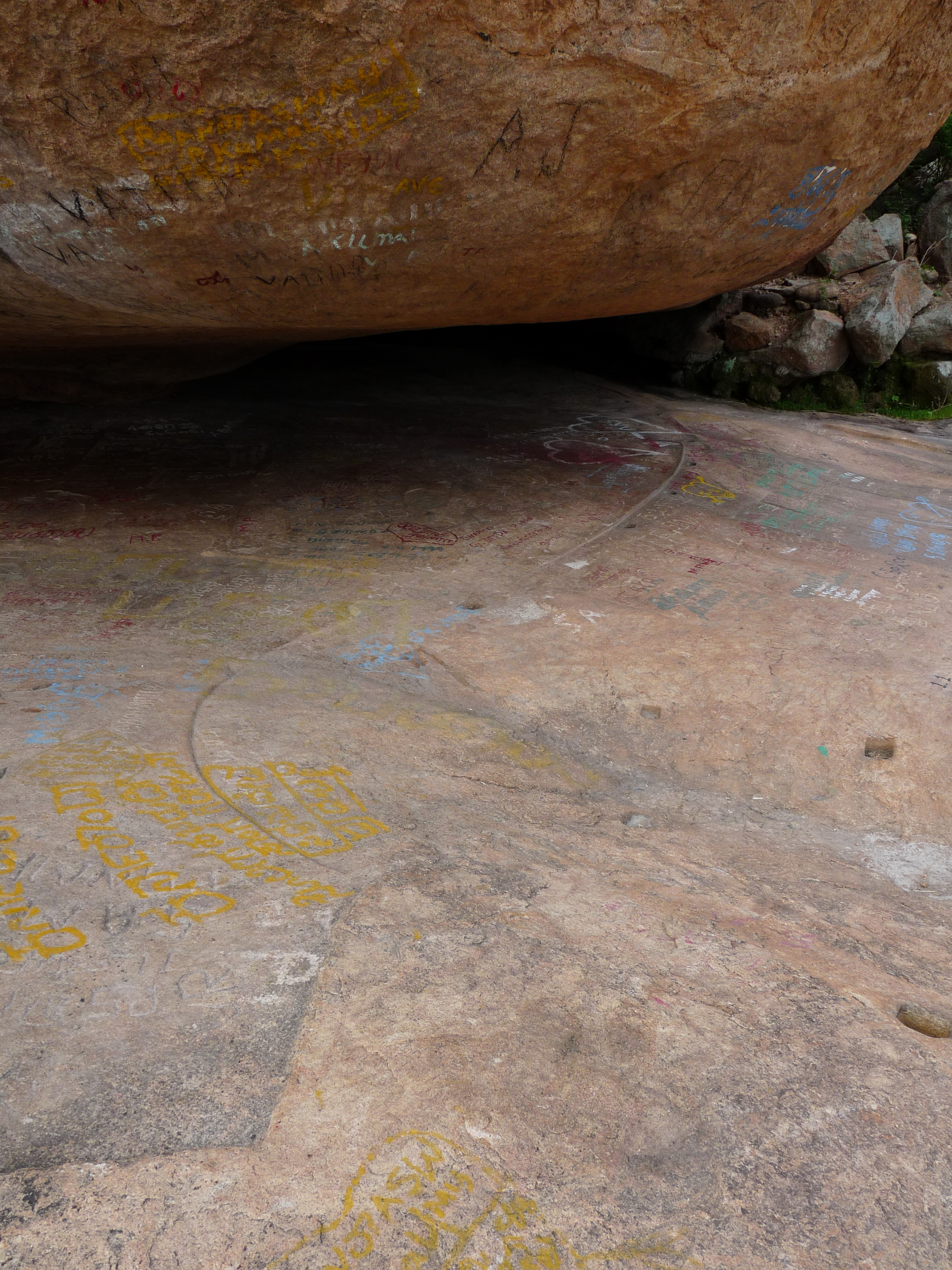
Panchapandavar beds

Keelavalavu is located in the Melur taluk of Madurai district. It is located 11 kilometres (6.8 mi) from Melur. In the 2011 census of India, it had a population of 5686, of which 2847 were males and 2839 females. The village is rich in granite and it is one of the hubs for illegal quarrying in the district.

=== Panchapandavar Malai ===
Panchapandavar Malai (Hill of Five Pandavas) is located in the village on the Melur – Tiruppattur road. The hillock contains caves that were converted as adobe by the Jain monks who lived here when their religion flourished in the ancient Tamil country. The hillock is one of the national monuments declared by the Archaeological Survey of India.

The cave contains nine Jain sculptures belonging to 9th and 10th century AD, including sculptures of Mahavira, the last thirthankara and Bahubali. It also contains Tamil-Brahmi and Vatteluttu inscriptions. The Tamil-Brahmi inscriptions in the cave were discovered by Venkoba Rao in 1903. The inscriptions were engraved from right to left and upside-down. This kind of inscription is only found here in the Kundrakudi hill. There are stone beds in the caves which were used by Jain monks for rest. An inscription in the cave mentions that these stone beds were sculptured by a person from Thondi.

== Quarrying ==
The granite quarrying in the hillock, carried out by the government and private companies, vandalised some of the sculptures and inscriptions. In response to a public interest litigation filed by the residents of the village in 2008, in 2011 the Madurai bench of Madras High Court banned the granite-quarrying activities of the Tamil Nadu Minerals Limited (TAMIN) and private companies inside an area of 51 acres (21 ha) around the hillock, citing the presence of a Jain monument of archaeological importance.
