= Directorate of Vigilance and Anti-Corruption =

Anti-corruption agency of the Government of Tamil Nadu, India

State agency overview
- Formed: 1964 (62 years ago)
- Jurisdiction: Tamil Nadu
- Status: active
- Headquarters: DVAC Headquarters, No.293, MKN Road, Alandur, Chennai T.N. 600 016
- Minister responsible: C. T. R. Nirmal Kumar, Minister for Law and Prevention of Corruption
- State agency executive: Abhay Kumar Singh, IPS., Director
- Website: www.dvac.tn.gov.in

Directorate of Vigilance and Anti-Corruption is an apex governmental body in Tamil Nadu to address governmental corruption. The Government of Tamil Nadu constituted this State Vigilance Commission headed by a Vigilance Commissioner in 1964.

== Organisation ==
The Directorate of Vigilance and Anti-Corruption is headed by a Director, appointed by the state Government of Tamil Nadu. The Director is an Indian Police Service officer and has the rank of Director General of Police (DGP). The headquarters is at Chennai, the capital of the state.

== Main Functions ==
- Conduct enquiries into the allegations of corruption referred to by the State Vigilance Commission/Government.
- Gather information and statistics to furnish the State Vigilance Commission
- Enquire on the corruption complaints made on public servants.
- Collect intelligence for detection of cases of bribery and corruption under Prevention of Corruption Act, 1988
- Set Traps catch corrupt government servants while accepting the bribe.

== Notable Cases ==
- Granite scam in Tamil Nadu, corruption scandal occurred in Madurai
- Disproportionate assets case against Jayalalithaa
- Graft case of R. Indira Kumari
- Land grabbing case on K. Ponmudy
- Allegation of corruption in Tamil Nadu Public Service Commission recruitment process.

== Former Directors ==
List of Directors.

Directors	Tenure
R.M.Mahadevan, IP.,	22.04.1964 - 15.12.1967
M.Balakrishna Menon, IP.,	16.12.1967 - 18.10.1971
E.L.Stracey, IP.,	18.10.1971 - 02.01.1975
K.R.Shenai, IPS.,	10.07.1975 - 30.06.1976
C.V.Narashimhan, IPS.,	01.07.1976 - 30.04.1977
N.Kirshnaswami, IPS.,	13.05.1977 - 31.08.1979
K.V.Subramanian, IPS.,	07.12.1979 - 30.06.1980
C.V.Narashimhan, IPS.,	01.07.1980 - 30.11.1983
V.R.Lakshmi Narayanan, IPS.,	01.02.1984 - 24.01.1985
K.Radhakrishnan, IPS.,	24.01.1985 - 12.04.1986
B.P.Rangasamy, IPS.,	13.04.1986 - 31.03.1988
C.L.Ramakrishnan, IPS.,	01.04.1988 - 30.11.1992
R.K.Raghavan, IPS.,	10.01.1993 - 01.01.1999
S.Ganapathy, IPS.,	13.01.1999 - 24.05.2001
B.P.Nailwal, IPS.,	24.05.2001 - 20.09.2001
V.K.Rajagopalan, IPS.,	20.09.2001 - 10.06.2002
G. Thilakavathi, IPS.,	10.06.2002 - 05.03.2003
G. Nanchil Kumaran, IPS.,	05.03.2003 - 20.05.2006
S.K.Upadhyay, IPS.,	20.05.2006 - 20.05.2008
K.Natarajan, IPS.,	20.05.2008 - 31.12.2008
K.Ramanujam, IPS.,	01.01.2009 - 06.10.2009
Bholanath, IPS.,	07.10.2009 - 20.05.2011
Dr.K.R.Shyam Sundar, IPS.,	21.05.2011 - 26.05.2011
K.P.Magendhran, IPS.,	08.06.2011 - 25.12.2011
T.K.Rajendran, IPS.,	28.12.2011 - 19.09.2012
S.K.Dogra, IPS.,	19.09.2012 - 31.12.2013
G.Venkataraman, IPS., (i/c)	01.01.2014 - 24.03.2017
M.N.Manjunatha, IPS.,	24.03.2017 - 19.04.2018
Dr.K.Jayanth Murali, IPS.,	30.04.2018 - 02.06.2019
Vijay Kumar, IPS.,	03.06.2019 - 30.09.2020
Dr.K.Jayanth Murali, IPS.,	30.09.2020 - 26.02.2021
Dr.P.Kandaswamy, IPS.,	11.05.2021- 30.04.2023
Abhay Kumar Singh, IPS.,	05.05.2023 F.N. - till date

== Former Office bearers ==
- Letika Saran, Additional director
- A. K. Viswanathan, Joint Director

== See also ==
- Prevention of Corruption Act, 1988
- Corruption in India
- Vigilance and Anti-Corruption Bureau, Kerala
