= P. Selvam =

Indian politician

Periyapullan P. Selvam

Member of the Tamil Nadu Legislative Assembly
- In office 19 May 2016 – 4 May 2026
- Preceded by: R. Samy
- Succeeded by: P. Viswanathan
- Constituency: Melur

Personal details
- Citizenship: Indian
- Party: All India Anna Dravida Munnetra Kazhagam
- Parent: Periyapullan (father)

Periyapullan alias Selvam is an Indian politician who is a Member of Legislative Assembly of Tamil Nadu. He was elected from Melur as an All India Anna Dravida Munnetra Kazhagam candidate in 2016, and reelected in 2021.

== Elections contested ==
Election	Constituency	Party	Result	Vote %	Runner-up	Runner-up Party	Runner-up vote %
2026 Tamil Nadu Legislative Assembly election	Melur	INC	Lost	31.50%	P. Selvam	ADMK	29.75%
2021 Tamil Nadu Legislative Assembly election	Melur	ADMK	Won	45.82%	T. Ravichandran	INC	26.49%
2016 Tamil Nadu Legislative Assembly election	Melur	ADMK	Won	51.54%	A. P. Ragupthy	DMK	40.11%
