= U. Sagayam =

Indian civil servant

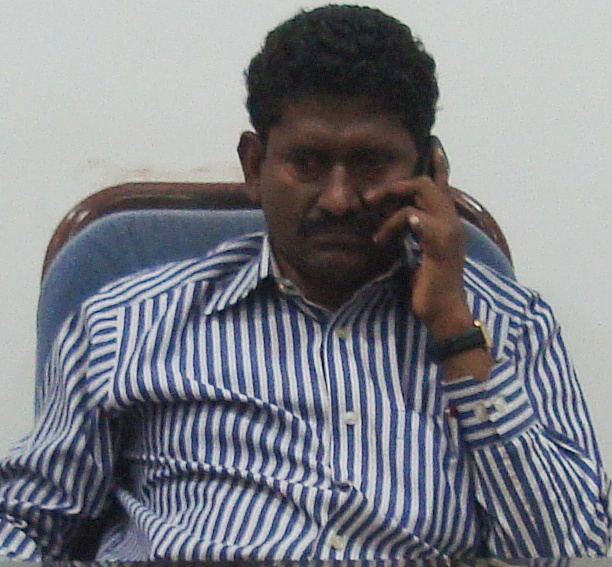
- Born: Ubagarampillai Sagayam; 22 March 1964 (age 62); Perunchunai , Pudukkottai, Pudukkottai District, Madras State (now Tamil Nadu, India)
- Education: M.A., B.L.
- Occupations: Civil Servant, Activist, Whistle blower
- Spouse: Vimala Sagayam
- Children: 2

U. Sagayam is a former career Indian civil servant who formerly served as Vice Chairman of Science City Chennai. During his career, he served both in Indian Administrative Service, as officer in the Tamil Nadu cadre and Central Secretariat Service.

Sagayam, whose office door bears a sign reading "Reject bribes, hold your head high", repeatedly antagonized influential politicians and their supporters in Tamil Nadu. In 2011, he was appointed to oversee state elections in the Madurai District; his strict enforcement of the laws against vote-buying played a role in the change of state government. Beginning in 2012, his investigation of complaints of illegal granite-mining in the Madurai area led to charges against a number of politicians and businesses, including a mining company founded by a scion of one of Madurai's most influential political families.

Sagayam efforts to eliminate corruption reportedly led to him being transferred for 26 times in the first 29 years of his career. They have also won him a reputation for probity; in the words of a Daily News and Analysis correspondent, "The common man's collector has become the hero of the local folklore".

== Early life and education ==
Sagayam is the youngest of five sons of a farmer from Perunchunai village, Pudukkottai, Tamil Nadu. He attended a Tamil-medium panchayat elementary school and then a Government Higher secondary school at Ellaippatti. He received his master's degrees in social work and in law.

== Career ==
Sagayam joined the Central Secretariat Service in 1989 after qualifying through the Civil Services Examination. After getting inducted, training and then after working for 7 months in New Delhi, Sagayam voluntary resigned from the Central Secretariat Service. He later took the Tamil Nadu Public Service Commission exams and was appointed in the Tamil Nadu State Civil Service. After attaining seniority in the service, he was promoted to Indian Administrative Service in 2001 batch.

In year 2020, he applied for voluntary resignation from IAS, two years before his natural retirement/superannuation. In 2021, Government of Tamil Nadu accepted his resignation.

In 1991, he started his career in Tamil Nadu as Tamil Nadu Civil Service officer, as a sub-divisional magistrate in the district of Ootacamund. In Ooty, Sagayam became embroiled in a dispute with the District Collector, whom he accused of favouritism toward the operators of large tea estates. Sagayam was relieved of his charges and transferred to another.

By 2000, Sagayam was an Additional District Magistrate in Kanchipuram. There, he closed the Pepsi bottling plant and forbade the sale of its output after dirt was found in several bottles. He also took on the so-called "sand mafia", responsible for unauthorized mining of sand from the bed of the Palar River, a practice that increases erosion and the incidence of flooding. Sagayam ordered a halt to dredging, and declined to rescind his order despite threats of physical violence.

In 2004, Sagayam, now working as deputy commissioner of civil supplies in Chennai, discovered that subsidized gas cylinders intended for domestic use were being illegally used by restaurants. He confiscated 5000 such cylinders.

By 2009, Sagayam was posted as the District Collector of the Namakkal district. In that year, he posted details of his personal assets—a bank balance of Rs 7,172 and a house in Madurai, jointly owned with his wife, worth Rs 9 lakh (Rs 900,000)—on the district website. Although this information was on file with the government and thus available for public perusal, Sagayam said, he felt that it should be made more visible to the public. In an interview with the Deccan Herald, he stated that the district collector should set an example of honesty for his subordinates, and that actions like his might tend to rehabilitate the tarnished image of civil servants. Sagayam was the first IAS officer in Tamil Nadu to publicize his financial information thus.

In Namakkal, Sagayam attempted to reform the village administrative officer (VAO) system. He pursued VAOs who lived in cities, far away from the villages that they were charged with overseeing. When VAOs and local politicians attempted to have Sagayam transferred, over 5000 villagers protested the transfer attempt, forcing its withdrawal.

=== Madurai ===
In March 2011, at the behest of the Election Commission of India, Sagayam was posted as the District Collector of Madurai, and as the ex-officio District Election Officer, he charged with the task of ensuring that the 2011 Legislative Assembly elections were conducted fairly. Sagayam arrived in the state 20 days before voting commenced. He staged a campaign to educate voters about the law, and to urge them to reject proffered bribes; he also stepped up efforts to detect vote-buying, and confiscated Rs 20 lakh (Rs 2,000,000) intended for distribution to voters. Sagayam was commended by India's Chief Election Commissioner for his work on the election.

In September 2011, Sagayam again found himself opposed to Alagiri. In constructing a family-owned engineering college near Madurai, Alagiri and family members had purportedly destroyed irrigation canals used by hundreds of impecunious farmers. Sagayam issued a "strongly worded summons" to Alagari and his wife and son, forcing him to come before a court and explain why action should not be taken against them.

=== Granite quarrying ===
In May 2012, Sagayam investigated reports of illegal granite quarrying in the vicinity of Madurai. These activities had been noted in 2008 by a Right to Information (RTI) activist. Pursuant to his complaint, the Madras High Court had ordered an inquiry in 2009, but nothing came of it until 2010, when Tamil-language daily newspaper Dina Bhoomi ran a series of articles. This led to the arrest on specious charges of the RTI activist and the Dina Bhoomi editor. The issue was brought up in the 2011 elections, and pursued after the AIADMK government was formed.

Sagayam's May 2012 report accused several senior officials of collusion with illegal granite miners, and suggested that losses to the state from illegal mining amounted to at least Rs 16,000 crore (Rs 160 billion), and possibly twice that. Four days later, he was transferred from his position as district collector to a post as managing director of Co-optex, a handloom weavers' cooperative in Chennai.

Sagayam came into conflict with a superior at Co-optex as well. When a manager at the cooperative was assaulted by members of AIADMK, Sagayam filed a complaint against the assailants, contrary to the wishes of state textiles minister S. Gokula Indira. He also refused to provide permanent office space in the cooperative's building to Indira, maintaining that this would interfere with the cooperative's functioning. As a result of this, Sagayam was transferred twice in September 2014: first to the position of Indian Medicine and Homeopathy commissioner; then, two days later, to the vice-chairmanship of Science City in Chennai.

Although the granite-quarrying investigation had languished after Sagayam's transfer, the issue did not die. Sagayam's report was leaked to the press in August 2012, prompting a public outcry that compelled the government to pursue the matter. Under Anshul Mishra, Sagayam's successor as district collector, a number of arrests were made in January 2013; Several officials, including two former Madurai district collectors, were investigated for alleged collusion with illegal granite operations. However, in June 2013, Mishra was transferred, and the investigation again lost all momentum.

In July 2014, as a citizen activist filed a petition with the Madras High Court, seeking to rekindle the inquiry. In response, the court appointed Sagayam to the post of Special Officer-cum-Legal Commissioner, charged with the task of investigating all mining operations in Tamil Nadu, and ordered the state government to relieve him of the Science City post. The government attempted to contest the order, maintaining that the investigation was concluded; the court rejected their arguments and, in November 2014, Sagayam was duly appointed. It was suggested, however, that the state government might attempt to limit his investigation to granite operations in the Madurai area, keeping him from looking into sand mining on the beaches and along the rivers of the state.

Sagayam's investigation was allegedly obstructed from several quarters. District officials purportedly gave him little cooperation; his room was allegedly wiretapped; and he and his team were purportedly attacked by goons acting on behalf of granite-mining interests. On one occasion, when the police were slow to exhume bodies of alleged victims of human sacrifice carried out by quarry operators, Sagayam spent the night in the graveyard to ensure that no one tampered with the evidence. The investigation discovered evidence of extensive illegal granite-mining from public and private land, and diversion or destruction of rivers and water bodies. Raids on the houses of two former Madurai collectors suggested complicity by government officials.
