= Pathini Penn =

Tamil drama film

- Directed by: R. C. Sakthi
- Story by: G. Thilakavathi
- Starring: Rupini; Livingston
- Cinematography: Viswam Nataraj
- Music by: M. S. Viswanathan
- Production company: Best Friends Creations
- Release date: 25 June 1993
- Country: India
- Language: Tamil

Pathini Penn (transl. The Virtuous Woman) is a 1993 Indian Tamil-language drama film directed by R. C. Sakthi. The film stars Rupini in title role and Livingston, with Nizhalgal Ravi, Janagaraj and V. Gopalakrishnan portraying supporting roles. The film, an adaptation of the novel of the same name by G. Thilakavathi, was released on 25 June 1993.

== Cast ==
- Rupini as Kavitha
- Livingston as Kadikalingam
- Nizhalgal Ravi as Prabhu
- Janagaraj as Narayanan
- V. Gopalakrishnan
- Vagai Chandrasekhar as Babu
- Chithra as Salma
- Sathyapriya as Vani

== Soundtrack ==
Soundtrack was composed by M. S. Viswanathan and lyrics were written by Pulamaipithan.

Track listing
No.	Title	Singer(s)	Length
1.	"Pandiya Naatu Seemai"	S. P. Balasubrahmanyam, Vani Jairam
2.	"Ulagam Namma Veedu"	Vani Jairam
3.	"Thottil Ondru Illai Endru"	S. P. Balasubrahmanyam
4.	"Ennamma Varutham"	S. P. Balasubrahmanyam

== Release and reception ==
Pathini Penn was released on 25 June 1993. Janagaraj bought the distribution rights of the film for Chennai. Malini Mannath of The Indian Express appreciated the film citing "Sakti's sensitive handling of the subject, his carefully etched scenes, his pithy hard-hitting dialogues, and his getting the best out of his artistes makes this film engrossing". The film won Tamil Nadu State Film Award for Best Film, R. C. Sakthi won Tamil Nadu State Film Award for Best Dialogue Writer, Rupini won the Tamil Nadu State Film Award Special Prize for Best Actress, and Pulamaipithan won Tamil Nadu State Film Award for Best Lyricist.
