= G. Nanchil Kumaran =

Indian police officer

- Occupation: IPS Officer
- Spouse: G. Thilakavathi IPS (Divorced)
- Children: Dhivya (Thilakavathi Daughter)

Dr. G. Nanchil Kumaran, also known as Nanjil Kumaran, is an Indian Police Service Officer from Tamil Nadu. He served as DVAC Director and Police commissioner in Chennai, and he became famous for helping solve the 1998 Coimbatore bombings.

== Marriage Life ==
In 1982, during IPS training, Dr.G. Nanchil Kumaran had a marriage with fellow IPS officer G. Thilakavathi. However, they got divorced after martial differences..
