= Melur Assembly constituency =

One of the 234 State Legislative Assembly Constituencies in Tamil Nadu, in India

Coordinates: 10.05°N 78.33°E

Melur
- Constituency No. 188 for the Tamil Nadu Legislative Assembly

Constituency details
- Country: India
- Region: South India
- State: Tamil Nadu
- District: Madurai
- Lok Sabha constituency: Madurai
- Established: 1951
- Total electors: 2,30,061
- Reservation: None

Member of Legislative Assembly
- 17th Tamil Nadu Legislative Assembly
- Incumbent P. Viswanathan
- Party: INC
- Alliance: TVK+
- Elected year: 2026

Melur is a legislative assembly constituency in Madurai district in the Indian state of Tamil Nadu. It is one of the 234 State Legislative Assembly Constituencies in Tamil Nadu, in India. Elections and winners from this constituency are listed below. Most successful party: INC (seven times).

== Members of Legislative Assembly ==
Year	Member	Political party
Madras State
1952	S. Chinnakaruppa Thevar	Indian National Congress
1952	P. Sivapirakasam	Indian National Congress
1957	M. Periyakaruppan Ambalam	Indian National Congress
1957	P. Kakkan	Indian National Congress
1962	M. Sivaramanambalam	Indian National Congress
Tamil Nadu
1977	A. M. Paramasivan	All India Anna Dravida Munnetra Kazhagam
1980	K. V. Veeranambalam	Indian National Congress (I)
1984	K. V. Veeranambalam	Indian National Congress
1989	K. V. V. Rajamanickam	Indian National Congress
1991	K. V. V. Rajamanickam	Indian National Congress
1996	K. V. V. Rajamanickam	Tamil Maanila Congress (Moopanar)
2001	R. Samy	All India Anna Dravida Munnetra Kazhagam
2006	R. Samy	All India Anna Dravida Munnetra Kazhagam
2011	R. Samy	All India Anna Dravida Munnetra Kazhagam
2016	Periyapullan @ P. Selvam	All India Anna Dravida Munnetra Kazhagam
2021	Periyapullan @ P. Selvam	All India Anna Dravida Munnetra Kazhagam
2026	P. Viswanathan	Indian National Congress

== Election results ==
Vote share of winning candidates
2026	31.50%
2021	45.82%
2016	51.54%
2011	55.74%
2006	47.32%
2001	46.32%
1996	62.21%
1991	72.33%
1989	36.41%
1984	60.11%
1980	54.60%
1977	36.07%
1962	43.19%
1957	22.18%
1952	27.28%

=== 2026 ===
2026 Tamil Nadu Legislative Assembly election: Melur
Party	Candidate	Votes	%	±%
INC	P. Viswanathan	60,080	31.50	▲5.01
TVK	A. Maduraiveeran	57,356	30.07	New
AIADMK	P. Selvam	56,744	29.75	▼16.07
AIPTMMK	Soniagandhi	2,628	1.38	New
Independent	M. Murugan	2,170	1.14	New
NOTA	NOTA	554	0.29	▼0.20
Margin of victory		2,724	1.43	▼17.90
Turnout		1,90,726	82.90	▲8.65
Registered electors		2,30,061		▼14,935
INC gain from AIADMK		Swing	▲5.01	

=== 2021 ===
2021 Tamil Nadu Legislative Assembly election: Melur
Party	Candidate	Votes	%	±%
AIADMK	Periyapullan @ P. Selvam	83,344	45.82%	−5.72
INC	T. Ravichandran	48,182	26.49%	New
AMMK	A. Selvaraj	34,262	18.84%	New
MNM	K. Kathiresan	2,176	1.20%	New
NOTA	NOTA	884	0.49%	+0.05
Margin of victory		35,162	19.33%	7.90%
Turnout		181,898	74.25%	0.04%
Registered electors		244,996		
AIADMK hold		Swing	-5.72%	

=== 2016 ===
2016 Tamil Nadu Legislative Assembly election: Melur
Party	Candidate	Votes	%	±%
AIADMK	Periyapullan @ P. Selvam	88,909	51.54%	−4.2
DMK	A. P. Ragupthy	69,186	40.11%	+0.25
TMC(M)	T. N. Bharath Natchiyappan	4,579	2.65%	New
BJP	P. V. Boopathikakkan	1,921	1.11%	+0.07
SDPI	S. Rishi Kapoor	828	0.48%	New
AIFB	S. Kalaimani	773	0.45%	New
NOTA	NOTA	757	0.44%	New
Margin of victory		19,723	11.43%	−4.45%
Turnout		172,501	74.20%	−3.35%
Registered electors		232,476		
AIADMK hold		Swing	-4.20%	

=== 2011 ===
2011 Tamil Nadu Legislative Assembly election: Melur
Party	Candidate	Votes	%	±%
AIADMK	R. Samy	85,869	55.74%	+8.42
DMK	R. Rani	61,407	39.86%	New
BJP	P. V. Dharmalingam	1,608	1.04%	New
BSP	Sarasukumar Vaira	1,080	0.70%	−0.25
RJD	M. Gopalakrishnan	856	0.56%	New
Independent	G. Vetrivel	836	0.54%	New
Margin of victory		24,462	15.88%	13.53%
Turnout		198,652	77.55%	6.39%
Registered electors		154,050		
AIADMK hold		Swing	8.42%	

=== 2006 ===
2006 Tamil Nadu Legislative Assembly election: Melur
Party	Candidate	Votes	%	±%
AIADMK	R. Samy	64,013	47.32%	+1
INC	K. V. V. Ravichandran	60,840	44.97%	New
DMDK	C. T. Rajaram	5,269	3.89%	New
BSP	M. Panneer Selvam	1,292	0.96%	New
Independent	R. Vairavan	1,143	0.84%	New
AIFB	O. Subramanian	1,018	0.75%	New
Margin of victory		3,173	2.35%	−19.08%
Turnout		135,283	71.16%	4.83%
Registered electors		190,114		
AIADMK hold		Swing	1.00%	

=== 2001 ===
2001 Tamil Nadu Legislative Assembly election: Melur
Party	Candidate	Votes	%	±%
AIADMK	R. Samy	58,010	46.32%	New
DMK	S. Samayanallur Selavarasu	31,172	24.89%	New
Independent	K. V. V. Rajamanickam	26,428	21.10%	New
MDMK	Veera Elavarasan	3,914	3.13%	−5.59
Independent	K. Rajakili	1,798	1.44%	New
JP	N. Dharmar Ambalam	1,208	0.96%	New
Democratic Forward Bloc	M. K. Karuppanan	1,158	0.92%	New
Independent	R. Elango	734	0.59%	New
Margin of victory		26,838	21.43%	−16.18%
Turnout		125,241	66.33%	0.11%
Registered electors		188,821		
AIADMK gain from TMC(M)		Swing	-15.89%	

=== 1996 ===
1996 Tamil Nadu Legislative Assembly election: Melur
Party	Candidate	Votes	%	±%
TMC(M)	K. V. V. Rajamanickam	73,999	62.21%	New
INC	C. R. Sundararajan	29,258	24.60%	−47.74
MDMK	Veera Ilavarasan	10,363	8.71%	New
JP	K. Puyal Ponniah	3,864	3.25%	New
Margin of victory		44,741	37.61%	−9.89%
Turnout		118,949	66.21%	0.87%
Registered electors		189,179		
TMC(M) gain from INC		Swing	-10.12%	

=== 1991 ===
1991 Tamil Nadu Legislative Assembly election: Melur
Party	Candidate	Votes	%	±%
INC	K. V. V. Rajamanickam	80,348	72.33%	+35.93
CPI(M)	N. Palanisamy	27,576	24.82%	New
AMI	P. Manickam	1,038	0.93%	New
Margin of victory		52,772	47.51%	39.86%
Turnout		111,082	65.34%	−7.15%
Registered electors		175,149		
INC hold		Swing	35.93%	

=== 1989 ===
1989 Tamil Nadu Legislative Assembly election: Melur
Party	Candidate	Votes	%	±%
INC	K. V. V. Rajamanickam	41,158	36.41%	−23.7
DMK	K. R. Thiagarajan	32,508	28.75%	New
AIADMK	A. M. Paramasivan	31,470	27.84%	−5.53
AIFB	N. Dharmar Abmalam	3,675	3.25%	New
Independent	P. R. Posalan	2,176	1.92%	New
Margin of victory		8,650	7.65%	−19.09%
Turnout		113,054	72.50%	−3.83%
Registered electors		159,210		
INC hold		Swing	-23.70%	

=== 1984 ===
1984 Tamil Nadu Legislative Assembly election: Melur
Party	Candidate	Votes	%	±%
INC	K. V. Veeranambalam	60,794	60.11%	+5.51
AIADMK	K. Thiyagarajan	33,748	33.37%	−8.94
INC(J)	A. M. Paramasivan	5,302	5.24%	New
Independent	S. Krishnan	821	0.81%	New
Margin of victory		27,046	26.74%	14.45%
Turnout		101,143	76.33%	3.42%
Registered electors		139,154		
INC hold		Swing	5.51%	

=== 1980 ===
1980 Tamil Nadu Legislative Assembly election: Melur
Party	Candidate	Votes	%	±%
INC	K. V. Veeranambalam	54,003	54.60%	+18.7
AIADMK	A. M. Paramasivan	41,849	42.31%	+6.24
Independent	J. S. Krishnan	1,356	1.37%	New
Independent	N. Ramu	686	0.69%	New
Independent	A. Ayyavu	516	0.52%	New
Independent	V. Ramamurthy	502	0.51%	New
Margin of victory		12,154	12.29%	12.12%
Turnout		98,912	72.90%	1.75%
Registered electors		137,381		
INC gain from AIADMK		Swing	18.53%	

=== 1977 ===
1977 Tamil Nadu Legislative Assembly election: Melur
Party	Candidate	Votes	%	±%
AIADMK	A. M. Paramasivan	33,111	36.07%	New
INC	K. V. Veernanamablam	32,955	35.90%	New
DMK	P. Malaichamy	22,337	24.33%	New
JP	O. Sethuraman	3,396	3.70%	New
Margin of victory		156	0.17%	
Turnout		91,799	71.15%	
Registered electors		130,502		
AIADMK gain from		Swing		

=== 1962 ===
1962 Madras Legislative Assembly election: Melur
Party	Candidate	Votes	%	±%
INC	M. Sivaraman Ambalam	28,986	43.19%	+21.01
DMK	V. V. N. Natarajan	20,985	31.27%	New
SWA	V. Poonnuchamy Ambalam	11,279	16.80%	New
CPI	M. Veeranam	5,867	8.74%	New
Margin of victory		8,001	11.92%	10.81%
Turnout		67,117	74.55%	−13.14%
Registered electors		94,071		
INC hold		Swing	21.01%	

=== 1957 ===
1957 Madras Legislative Assembly election: Melur
Party	Candidate	Votes	%	±%
INC	P. Kakkan	33,123	22.18%	−5.11
INC	M. Periya Karuppan Ambalam	31,461	21.06%	−6.22
Independent	K. Paramasamy Ambalam	25,583	17.13%	New
Independent	P. Vadivel (Sc)	20,804	13.93%	New
Independent	I. Samadharman (Sc)	14,575	9.76%	New
Independent	K. P. S. P. Karuppiha Chettiar	13,672	9.15%	New
Independent	A. Velusamy	10,150	6.80%	New
Margin of victory		1,662	1.11%	−4.85%
Turnout		149,368	87.69%	−3.69%
Registered electors		170,331		
INC hold		Swing	-5.11%	

=== 1952 ===
1952 Madras Legislative Assembly election: Melur
Party	Candidate	Votes	%	±%
INC	S. Chinnakaruppa Thavar	40,032	27.28%	New
INC	P. Sivaparakasam	31,277	21.31%	New
AIFB	B. Ponachami Ambalan	22,437	15.29%	New
CPI	K. Veerana Veduvan	14,930	10.17%	New
Socialist Party (India)	Chellathayammal	14,156	9.65%	New
Socialist Party (India)	A. Aiyannan	10,367	7.06%	New
Independent	R. V. Sahadevan	4,898	3.34%	New
Independent	Chinna Periyambillai	4,736	3.23%	New
Independent	R. Sethuramakrishna Iyer	3,908	2.66%	New
Margin of victory		8,755	5.97%	
Turnout		146,741	91.38%	
Registered electors		160,580		
INC win (new seat)				
