= P. Viswanathan =

Indian politician

Minister of Higher Education Government of Tamil Nadu
- Incumbent
- Assumed office 21 May 2026
- Governor: Rajendra Arlekar
- Chief Minister: C. Joseph Vijay
- Ministry and Departments: Higher Education Department
- Preceded by: Govi. Chezhian

Member of the Tamil Nadu Legislative Assembly
- Incumbent
- Assumed office 4 May 2026
- Preceded by: Periyapullan @ P. Selvam
- Constituency: Melur

Member of Parliament, Lok Sabha
- In office 16 May 2009 – 16 May 2014
- Preceded by: constituency created
- Succeeded by: Maragatham Kumaravel
- Constituency: Kancheepuram

Personal details
- Born: 20 May 1964 (age 62) Cuddalore, Tamil Nadu, India
- Citizenship: Indian
- Party: Indian National Congress

P. Viswanathan is an Indian politician and incumbent member of the Parliament of India from Kancheepuram Constituency. He represents the Indian National Congress party. On 4 May 2026, he was elected as Member of Legislative Assembly to Melur.

On 21 May 2026, Viswanathan was one of the 2 MLAs from Congress to get minister berths in TVK-led Government of Tamil Nadu. He is currently serving as Minister for Higher Education.

== Electoral performance ==
=== Assembly election ===
2026 Tamil Nadu Legislative Assembly election: Melur
Party	Candidate	Votes	%	±%
INC	P. Viswanathan	60,080	31.50	▲5.01
TVK	A. Maduraiveeran	57,356	30.07	New
AIADMK	P. Selvam	56,744	29.75	▼16.07
AIPTMMK	Soniagandhi	2,628	1.38	New
Independent	M. Murugan	2,170	1.14	New
NOTA	NOTA	554	0.29	▼0.20
Margin of victory		2,724	1.43	▼17.90
Turnout		1,90,726	82.90	▲8.65
Registered electors		2,30,061		▼14,935
INC gain from AIADMK		Swing	▲5.01	

=== Lok Sabha General election ===
2009 Indian general election: Kancheepuram
Party	Candidate	Votes	%	±%
INC	P. Viswanathan	330,237	41.99	
AIADMK	Dr. E. Ramakrishnan	3,17,134	40.32	
DMDK	T. Tamilvendan	1,03,560	13.17	
BSP	K. Uthrapathi	5,663	0.72	
Independent	C. A. Balakrishnan	5,161	0.66	
Margin of victory		13,103	1.67	
Turnout		10,60,188	74.18	
Rejected ballots		193	0.02	
INC win (new seat)				
