= Letika Saran =

Indian police officer

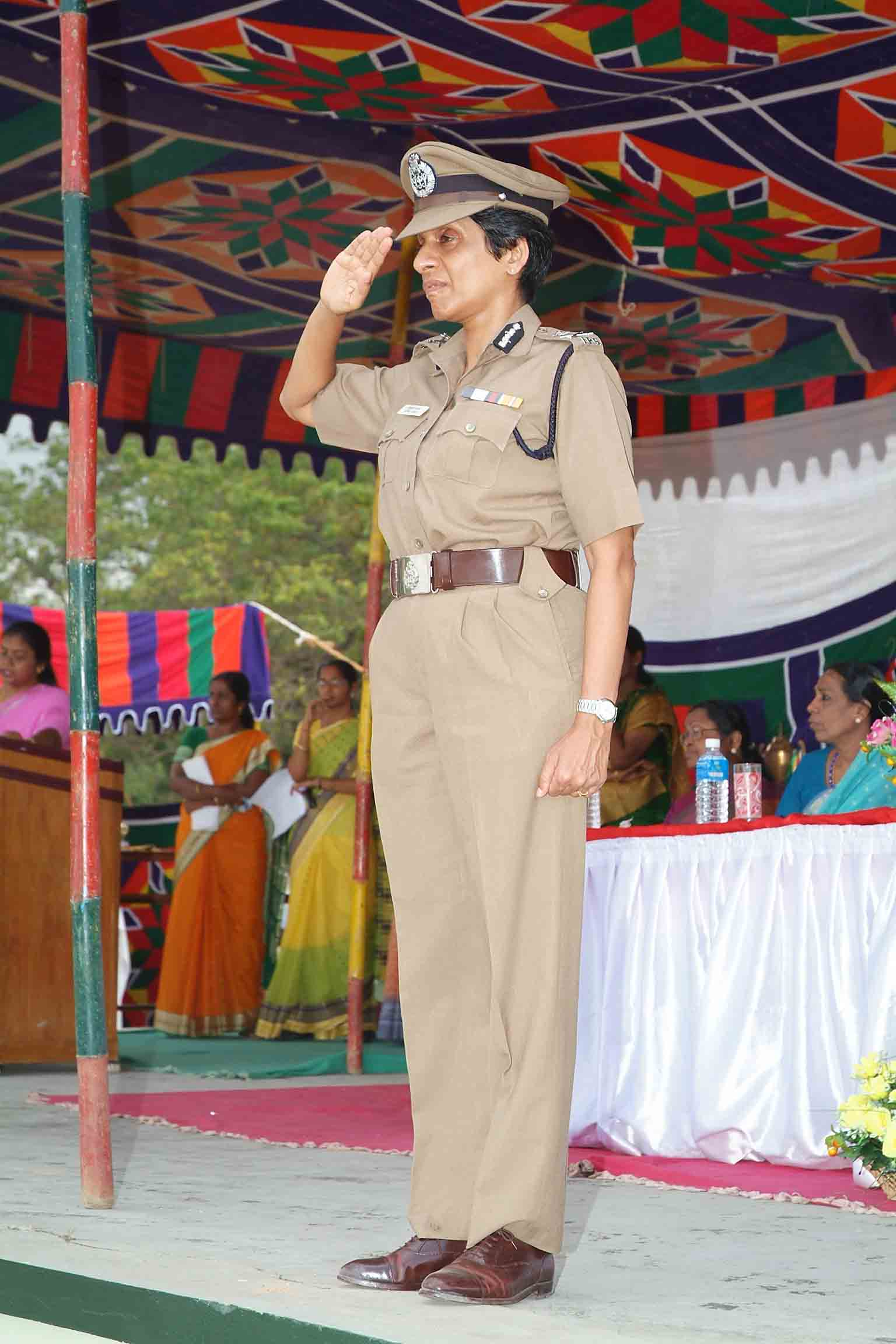
- Born: 31 March 1952 (age 74); Idukki, Kerala
- Occupation: IPS Officer

Letika Saran is the former Director General of Police, Tamil Nadu, India. Earlier she served as the 36th Commissioner of Police in Chennai. She is the only woman to head a metropolitan police organization in India. Before that she was an Additional Director-General of Police (ADGP).

== Early life ==
Saran was born on 31 March 1952 in Idukki district in Kerala. Her father's name is NS Dhar. He was the first planter at James Finlay and Co, which later became Tata Tea. Her mother's name is Vijayalakshmi Dhar. She entered the Tamil Nadu Indian Police Service in 1976 as one of the first two women to be admitted, the other being Thilagavathi.

== Career ==
Saran's postings include ADGP; Training and Project Director, Tamil Nadu Police Academy; Inspector-General of Police, Directorate of Vigilance and Anti-Corruption (DVAC). She became the Commissioner of Police, Greater Chennai on 20 April 2006.

On 8 January 2010, she was appointed as Director General of Police (DGP) for Tamil Nadu, becoming the second female DGP of a state in India and the first for Tamil Nadu. Saran's appointment was later challenged by another IPS officer who claimed his seniority had been overlooked. In October 2010, the Madras High Court overturned Saran's appointment and ruled that a list of three eligible candidates must be presented from which the state government would make their selection. The state government, "after due consideration and in full compliance with the directions of the Supreme Court," again chose Saran from the list. She was re-appointed on 27 November 2010.

Saran retired in April 2012.

== Post-retirement ==
After her retirement, she spends her time by engaging in social activities. She gave more importance to the road safety sector by taking awareness sessions in schools, colleges and has been engaging and creating awareness through NGOs too. She also inaugurated a massive Traffic Awareness Campaign held on 100 traffic signals across Chennai on the same day and at the same time on 9 August 2015, organized by Thozhan NGO which works on creating road safety awareness along with Good Samaritan Law awareness to transform our country into an Accident Free Nation. Along with the volunteers, she also interacted with the public, distributed awareness pamphlets and spoke to them about the importance of following road safety rules.
