= Department of Higher Education (Tamil Nadu) =

Government department in Tamil Nadu, India

Agency overview
- Formed: 1997; 29 years ago
- Jurisdiction: Tamil Nadu
- Headquarters: Chennai
- Minister responsible: P. Viswanathan, Minister for Higher Education Department
- Agency executive: Principal Secretary to Government
- Parent agency: Government of Tamil Nadu
- Website: Higher Education Department

The Department of Higher Education is one of the departments of Government of Tamil Nadu. Established in 1997, the department is responsible for formulating policies and regulations for higher education in the state.

== History ==
The Directorate of Technical Education was established on 14 October 1957. The higher education department was formed in 1997, after bifurcation from the combined education, science and technology department.

== Objective ==
The department is responsible for formulating policies, laws, regulations and programmes for higher education in the state.

== Infrastructure ==
As of 2023, there are 56 universities in the state including 24 public universities. University of Madras was founded in 1857 and is one of India's first modern universities. There are more than 510 engineering colleges in the state including 34 government colleges with the government-run College of Engineering, Guindy, Anna University founded in 1794 is the oldest engineering college in India. There are also 496 polytechnic institutions with 92 government colleges and 935 arts and science colleges in the state including 302 government run colleges.

== Sub–departments ==
The following sub-departments and undertakings operate under the department:

Sub-departments

- Directorate of Collegiate Education (TNDCE)
- Directorate of Technical Education (TNDTE)
- Department of Archives and Historical Research

Undertakings and bodies

- Science City Chennai
- Tamil Nadu Science and Technology Centre (TNSTC)
- Tamil Nadu State Council for Science and Technology (TANSCST)
- Tamil Nadu State Council for Higher Education (TANSCHE)
- Tamil Nadu State Council for Technical Education (TANSCTE)
- Tamil Nadu State Urdu Academy

== Ministers ==
Name	Portrait	Term of office		Party
Ministers of Education
C. Aranganayagam		30 June 1977	17 February 1980	AIADMK
C. Aranganayagam		9 June 1980	9 February 1985	AIADMK
C. Ponnaiyan		10 February 1985	30 January 1988	AIADMK
K. Anbazhagan		27 January 1989	30 January 1991	DMK
R. M. Veerappan		24 June 1991	12 May 1996	AIADMK
K. Anbazhagan		13 May 1996	13 May 2001	DMK
M. Thambidurai		14 May 2001	1 March 2002	AIADMK
C. V. Shanmugam		2 March 2002	12 May 2006	AIADMK
Ministers of Higher Education
K. Ponmudy		13 May 2006	15 May 2011	DMK
P. Palaniappan		16 May 2011	22 May 2016	AIADMK
K. P. Anbalagan		23 May 2016	6 May 2021	AIADMK
K. Ponmudy		7 May 2021	21 December 2023	DMK
Raja Kannappan		21 December 2023	22 March 2024	DMK
K. Ponmudy		22 March 2024	28 September 2024	DMK
Govi. Chezhian		29 September 2024	5 May 2026	DMK
P. Viswanathan		21 May 2026	Incumbent	INC

== See also ==
- Department of Higher Education (India)
- Government of Tamil Nadu
- List of Tamil Nadu Government's Educational Institutions
- Ministry of Human Resource Development (India)
- State Board of School Examinations (Sec.) & Board of Higher Secondary Examinations, Tamil Nadu (SBSEBHSE)
- Tamil Nadu Government's Departments
