= Science City station =

Science City station may refer to:

- Science City station (Chengdu Metro)
- Science City station (Guangzhou Metro)

== See also ==
- Science City (disambiguation)
