= K. V. V. Rajamanickam =

Indian politician

K. V. V. Rajamanickam is an Indian politician and former Member of the Legislative Assembly of Tamil Nadu. He was elected to the Tamil Nadu legislative assembly as an Indian National Congress candidate from Melur constituency in 1989, and 1991 elections and as a Tamil Maanila Congress (Moopanar) candidate in 1996 election.
