= G. Thilakavathi =

Indian police official and writer

G. Thilakavathi IPS
- Born: G. Thilakavathi; 1952 (age 73–74); Kumarasamypettai village, Dharmapuri district of Tamil Nadu
- Education: B.A. Economics in Auxilium College,Vellore, M.A. Economics in Stella Maris College.
- Occupations: Indian Police Service, Novelist & Short story Writer
- Spouse(s): Mr.Ilango (Divorced), Dr.G. Nanchil Kumaran IPS (Divorced)
- Children: Joyce Rekha, Dr. Prabhu Thilak, Dhivya.
- Writing career
- Notable awards: Sahitya Akademi Award (2005)

G. Thilakavathi (or Thilagavathi) (Tamil: ஜி. திலகவதி) is a retired Indian Police Service officer and first woman IPS officer in the state of Tamil Nadu, India and before retiring serverd as Director General of Tamil Nadu Police - DGP (2010-2011). Having achieved greater heights in her illustrious police career, she is also literature lover & writer and is a Sahitya Akademi (Tamil) winner for her Novel Kalmaram.

== Personal life ==
G. Thilakavathi was born on 1952 in Kumarasamypettai village, Dharmapuri district of Tamil Nadu. Her father name was Govindasami Reddiar. Coming from backward Dharmapuri region, displayed an extraordinary aptitude for academics. She was enrolled in school early. With accelerated promotions, she progressed to higher classes, rubbing shoulders with children much older than her. She obtained a B.A. Economics degree in Auxilium College,Vellore after a failed marriage break, and completed M.A. Economic in Stella Maris College, Chennai.

=== Marriage Life ===
G. Thilakavathi had two failed Marriages. Married at the age of 16, she had a abusive husband and got separated. In 1982, during her IPS training, had a second marriage with fellow IPS officer Dr.G. Nanchil Kumaran and it did not last long due to marital differences.

== Indian Police Service Career ==
In 1976, she became the first woman from Tamil Nadu to become an Indian Police Service (IPS) officer. She began her police career as an Assistant superintendent of Police serving in Vellore and later Tiruchirappalli. She subsequently served as Deputy Commissioner of Police of Chennai and Superintendent of Police in the Civil Supplies CID and Commercial Crime Investigation Wing, before being promoted to the rank of Deputy inspector general of police (DIG), while being posted to the Railways in early 1993. Later that year, she was appointed the DIG for the Chengalpattu-MGR range, that covered districts Chengalpattu East and West, and South Arcot. In the process became the first woman DIG of the State. In 2007, she was promoted to Additional Director General of Police (ADGP). In 2010, she was posted as chairman of the Tamil Nadu Uniformed Services Recruitment Board, upon receiving a promotion to the rank of Director general of police.

== Literature Works ==
G.Thilakavathi has scaled heights in the Tamil literary world, penning poetry, nine novels, 18 novellas, nine short story collections, comprising over 150 short stories, 11 essay collections, 14 translations and edited eight books. In 1987, her first short story was published in Dinakaran. Her first short story collection to be published in book form was 'Theyumo sooriyan'. Her short stories Theiyumo Sooriyan (Will the Sun Wane) and Arasigal aluvathillai (Queens don’t cry) won the Government of Tamil Nadu's best short story prize for 1988-89. Her novel Pathini Penn (1983) was made into a film. Some of her works including Vaarthai thavari vittai, Arasigal aluvathillai,Muppathu kodi mugangal have been adapted for television. She is also a translator for Sahitya Akademi and has translated Nizhal Kodugal, Uthirum Ilaigalin Oosai, Govarthan Ram and 50 short stories into Tamil. In 2005, she was awarded the Sahitya Akademi Award for Tamil for her novel Kalmaram (lit. The Stone Tree).

== Partial bibliography ==
=== Novel's ===
- Inimel Vidiyum (இனிமேல் விடியும்) 1989
- Pathini Penn (பத்தினிப்பெண்) 1993. The 1993 film Pathini Penn, an adaptation of the novel of the same name.
- Kaan Thiranthida Vendum (கண்திறந்திட வேண்டும்) 1996
- Sopana Boomiyil (சொப்பன பூமியில்) 1998
- Kanavai soodiya natchathiram (கனவைச் சூடிய நட்சத்திரம்) 2001
- Thilkavathi Novels 1 & 2 (Compilation) (திலகவதி நாவல்கள் 1 & 2(தொகுப்பு)) 2004
- Kalmaram (கல்மரம்) 2005 Winner of Sahitya Akademi Award.
- Unakagava Naan (உனக்காகவா நான்) 2007
- Tamizh Kodiyin Kadhal (தமிழ்க்கொடியின் காதல்) 2007
- Nesathunai (நேசத்துணை)
- Kaikul Vanam (கைக்குள் வானம்)
- Oru aathmavin diary - sila varangal (ஒரு ஆத்மாவின் டயரி சில வரங்கள்)
- Theeku Kanal Thantha Devi (தீக்குக் கனல் தந்த தேவி)

=== Essay's ===
- Mudivu Edu (முடிவெடு)
- Vergal Vilzhuthugal (வேர்கள் விழுதுகள்)
- Sama Dharma Penniyum (சமதர்மப் பெண்ணியம்)
- Maanuda Magathuvangal (மானுட மகத்துவங்கள்)

=== Short story collection's ===
- Theyumo sooriyan(தேயுமோ சூரியன்) 1987
- Arasigal aluvathillai (அரசிகள் அழுவதில்லை) 1988

=== Poetry collection ===
- Alai puralum karayoram (அலை புரளும் கரையோரம்) 1987

=== Translation ===
- Anbulla Pilathuvukku (அன்புள்ள பிலாத்துவுக்கு): Two Novellas - Paul Zacharia
- Ithwa Munda's Victory (இத்வா முண்டாவுக்கு வெற்றி): Etoa Munda Won the Battle - Mahasweta Devi
- The Sound of Falling Leaves (உதிரும் இலைகளின் ஓசை): Patjhad Ki Aawaz - Qurratul Ain Haider
- Bholuvum and Gholuvum(போலுவும் கோலுவும்): Bholu and Gholu - Pankaj Bisht
- En Thalaimattil Oru Sarakkonrai Maram: (என் தலைமட்டில் ஒரு சரக்கொன்றை மரம்) Laburnum For My Head - Temsüla Ao

== Awards ==
- 2005 - Sahitya Akademi (Tamil)
- 2020 - Tamil Nadu Government's Best Translator Award

== See also ==
- List of Sahitya Akademi Award winners for Tamil
- List of Indian writers
- List of Tamil-language writers
