= Science City Chennai =

Science City
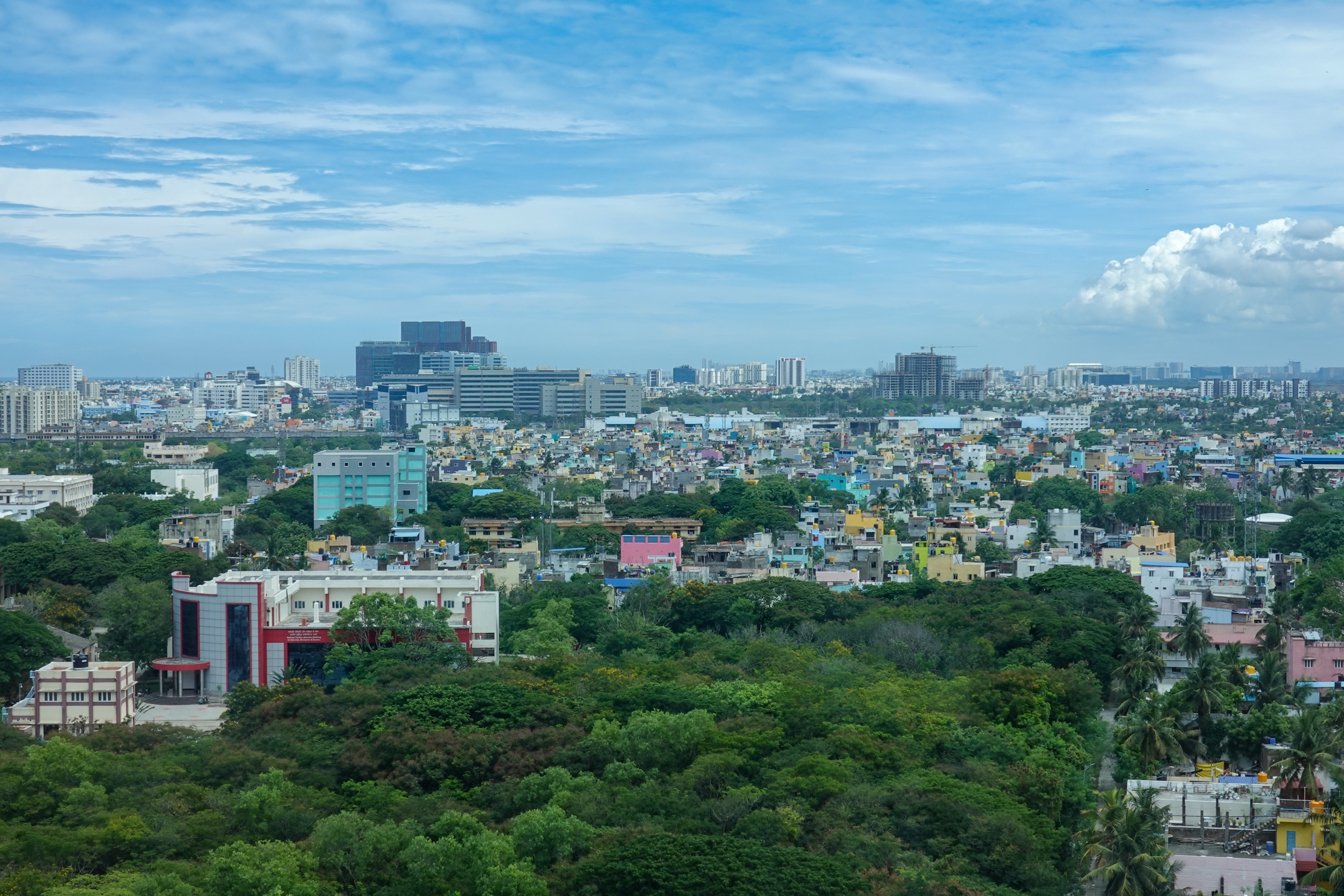
- Part of Science City as viewed from IIT Madras with Taramani to the right
- Formation: 1998
- Type: Special zone
- Purpose: Education and research
- Location: Chennai, India
- Region served: Chennai
- Parent organization: Department of Higher Education, Government of Tamil Nadu
- Website: sciencecitychennai.in

Science City Chennai is an autonomous organization established in 1998 under the Department of Higher Education of the Government of Tamil Nadu. It is registered under the Tamil Nadu Societies Registration Act, 1975. Located in South Chennai, the area incorporates the region south of Adyar river and west of the Buckingham canal, extending from Kotturpuram in the north to Taramani in the south. The area consists of an agglomeration of more than 69 educational and research institutions, including IIT Madras, and the University of Madras (Taramani).

The Science city was established with the goal of encouraging and popularising science with students, researchers and the general public. It organises lectures, seminars, workshops, conferences, and training programmes. It also gives away various annual awards to honor scientists and science teachers.

== See also ==
- Gujarat Science City
- Pushpa Gujral Science City, Kapurthala
- Science City Kolkata
- Science Centre, Surat
