= Science City, Kolkata =

Science centre in Kolkata, India

Coordinates: 22°32′26″N 88°23′45″E

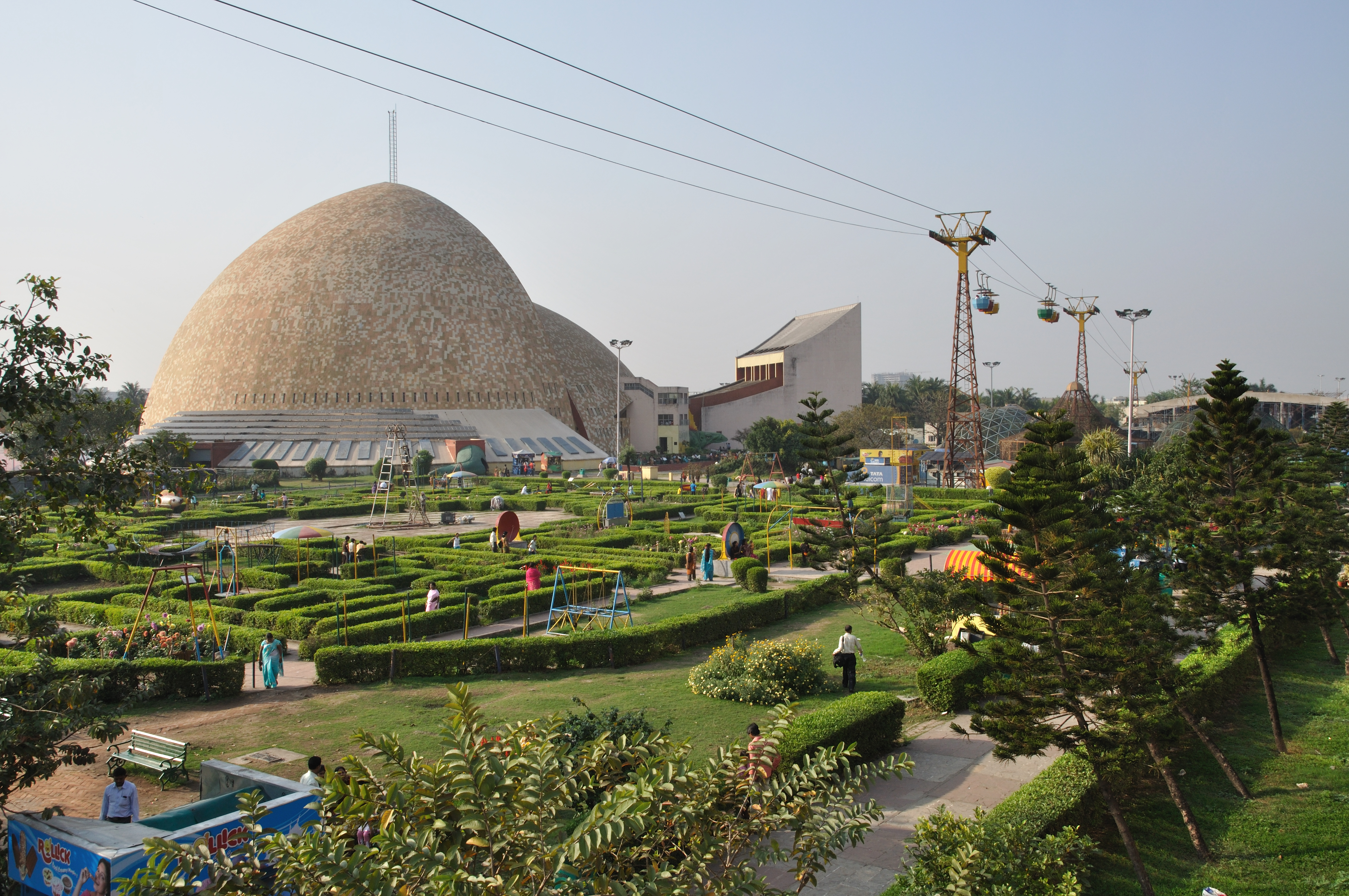
- Science City, Kolkata
- Interactive map of Science City, Kolkata
- Location: Kolkata, India
- Owner: Government of India
- Operator: National Council of Science Museums
- Type: Science Centre
- Event: Educational
- Acreage: 49.6 Acres

Construction
- Opened: 1 July 1997; 29 years ago

Website
- www.sciencecitykolkata.org.in

Science City, Kolkata is a science centre and science park in Kolkata, West Bengal, India. It is currently the largest science centre in the Indian subcontinent, containing a science museum, science park, and auditoriums. The centre was inaugurated in two parts, with the ‘Convention Centre Complex’ being the first on 21 December 1996, followed by the rest on 1 July 1997 by the then-prime-minister Inder Kumar Gujral. On 10 January 2010 the prime minister of India, Manmohan Singh, would attempt to get the second phase of Science City completed.

== Galleries ==
Dynamotion Hall

The Dynamotion Hall offers various hands-on and interactive exhibits on wide various scientific topics with exhibits such as:

- Illusions. A permanent exhibition on illusions, with interactive exhibits, to see how motion and placement affect visual perception.
- Powers of Ten. Exhibits illustrate the size of the universe from the smallest to the biggest scales of the known universe by powers of ten.
- Fresh Water Aquarium. A variety of freshwater fishes in 26 tanks.
- Live Butterfly Enclave. A colony of live butterflies hatched on site and a screening of a film Rang Bahari Prajapati on the life cycle of the butterfly.
- Science On a Sphere. A spherical projection system created by NOAA providing shows of 30 minutes duration for around 70 people at a time.

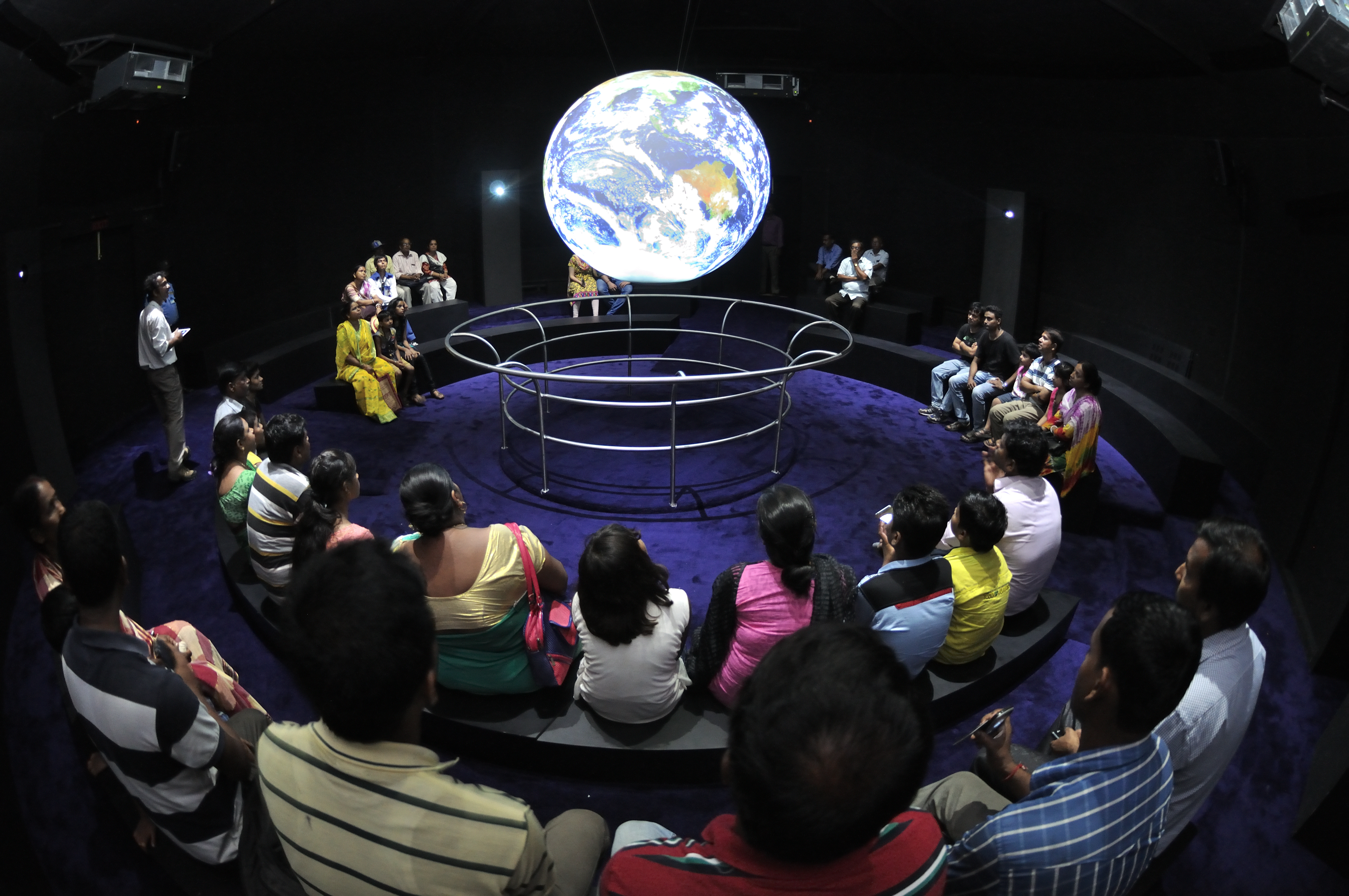
The Science On a Sphere show at Dynamotion Hall

== Earth Exploration Hall ==
Inaugurated on 6 December 2008 by Ambika Soni, the then Union Minister for Culture, the Earth Exploration Hall is a permanent exhibition on Earth, housed in a two storied hemispherical building that displays the details of the southern hemisphere in the ground floor and northern hemisphere in the first floor. Slicing a huge earth globe at the centre of the hall into 12 segments vertically in each hemisphere, important features of each segment such as physical geography, lands and people, flora and fauna, and other dynamic natural phenomenon on earth are highlighted around the central globe with the modern display technologies, attractive visuals, interactive multimedia, video walls, panoramic videos, tilting tables, computer kiosks, and 3-D effects theatre.

Former Directors
- T K Ganguly
- G S Rautela
- A D Choudhury
- S Chaudhuri

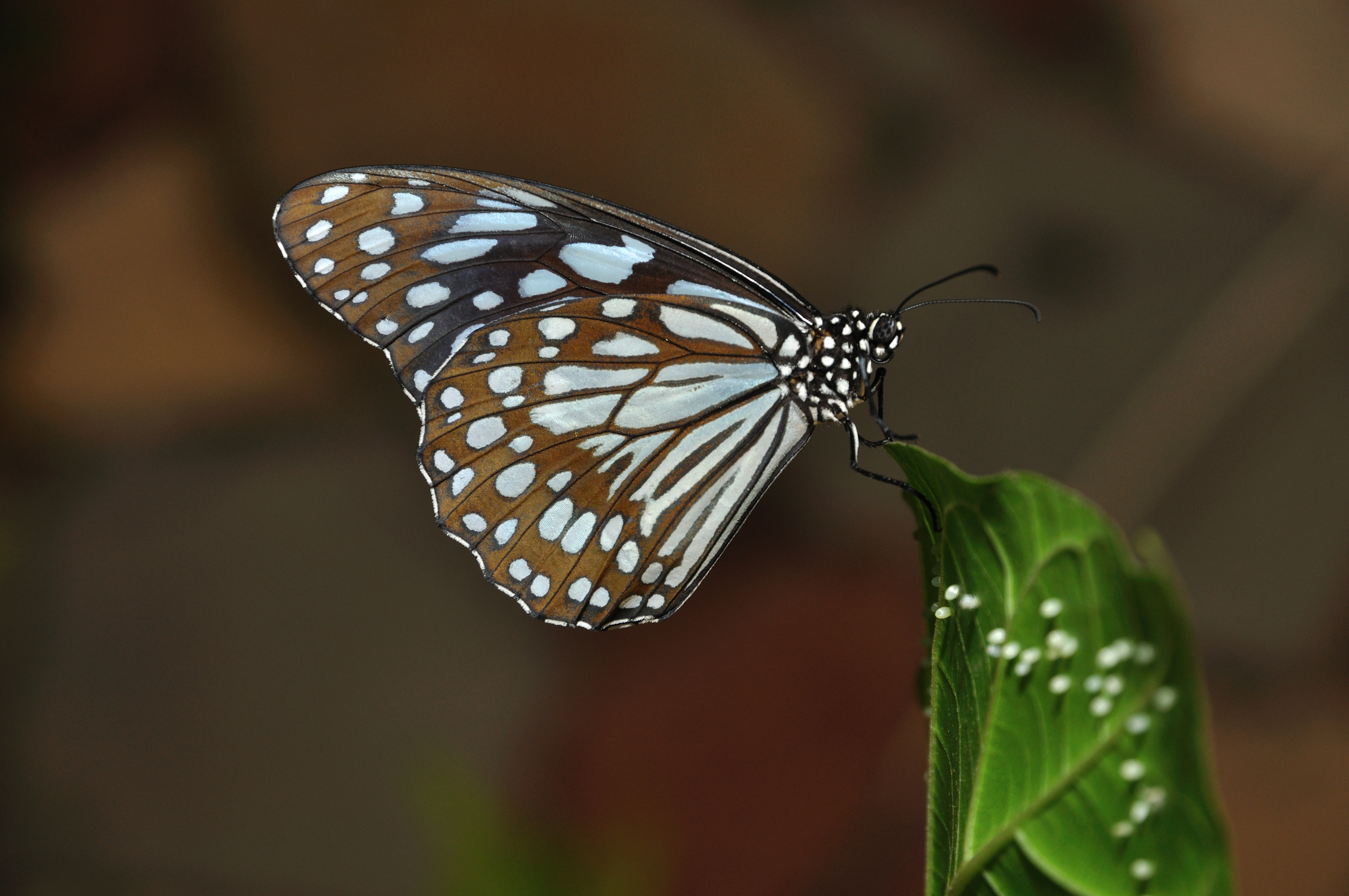
A full grown butterfly with eggs in controlled environment at Science City, Kolkata.

Transverse Wave Motion inside Science City

== Space Odyssey ==
A Space Theatre equipped with a Helios Star Ball planetarium supported by 150 special effect projectors and an Astrovision 10/70 large format film projection system housed in a 23-meter diameter tilted dome having unidirectional seating arrangements for 360 person immersive shows on space sciences.

- 3-D Vision Theater. A show based a on stereo back projection system where visitors experience 3D via Polaroid spectacles.
- Mirror Magic. 35 exhibits exploring the reflection of light.
- Time Machine. A 30-seater motion simulator provides virtual experiences of space flight or journeys into unknown worlds sitting in a capsule maneuvered by a hydraulic motion control system.

== Maritime Centre ==
The Maritime Centre depicts the maritime history of India, including artifacts, dioramas, and interactive exhibits on shipping and navigation systems.

== Science Park ==
The Science Park. Dec. 2015

In a tropical country like India, the outdoors is sunny and more inviting than the indoors for most of the year. In a Science Park, people come closer to plants, animals, and other objects in their natural surroundings and also learn about basic principles of science in an open air learning environment. The park's interactive exhibits are engineered so as to tolerate all weather. The Science Park has become an integral part in all the centres of the National Council of Science Museums. It comprises a Caterpillar Ride, Gravity Coaster, Musical Fountain, Road Train, Cable Cars, Monorail Cycle, butterfly nursery, and several exhibits on physical and life sciences, as well as a maze.

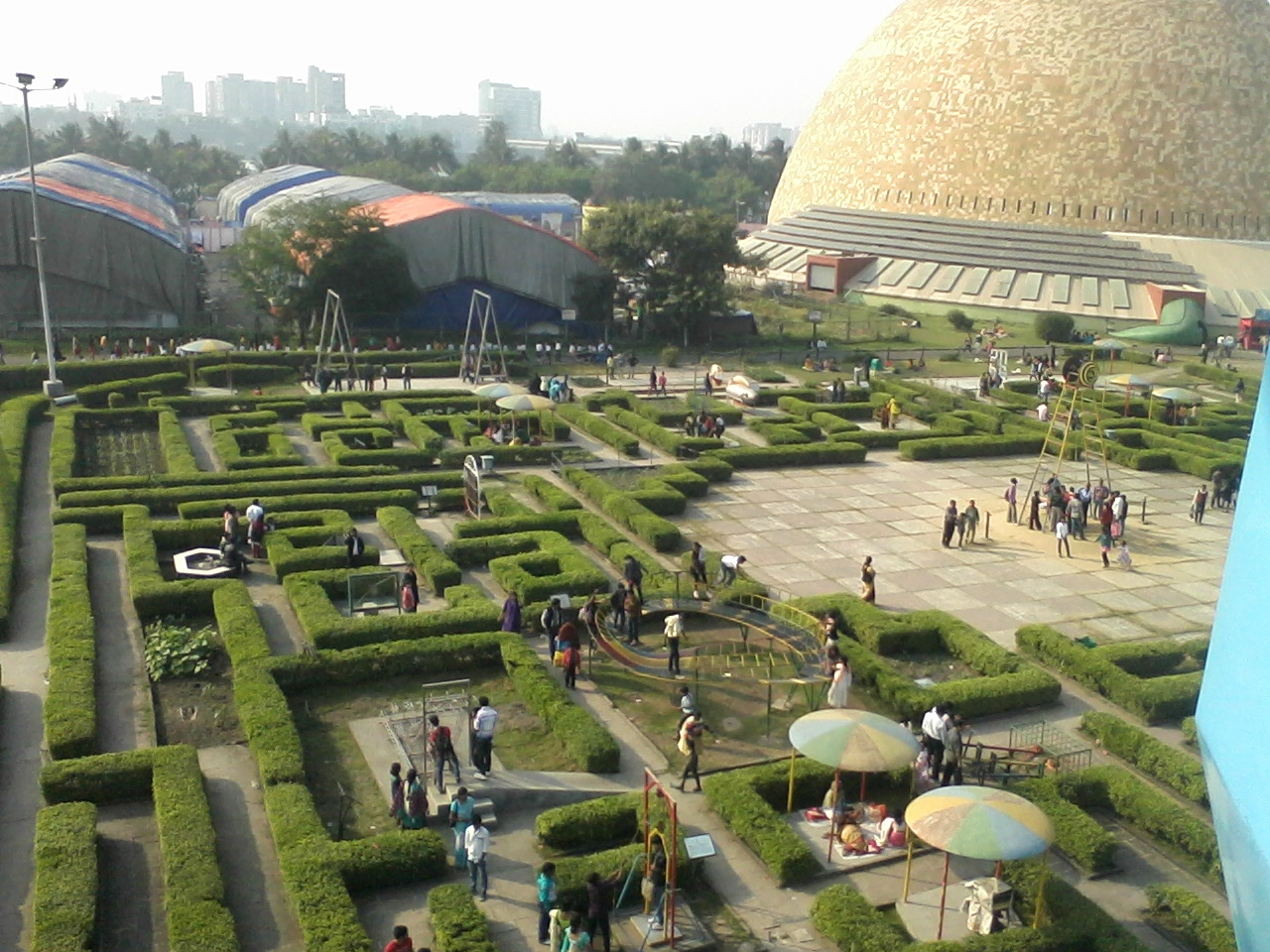
Science Park view

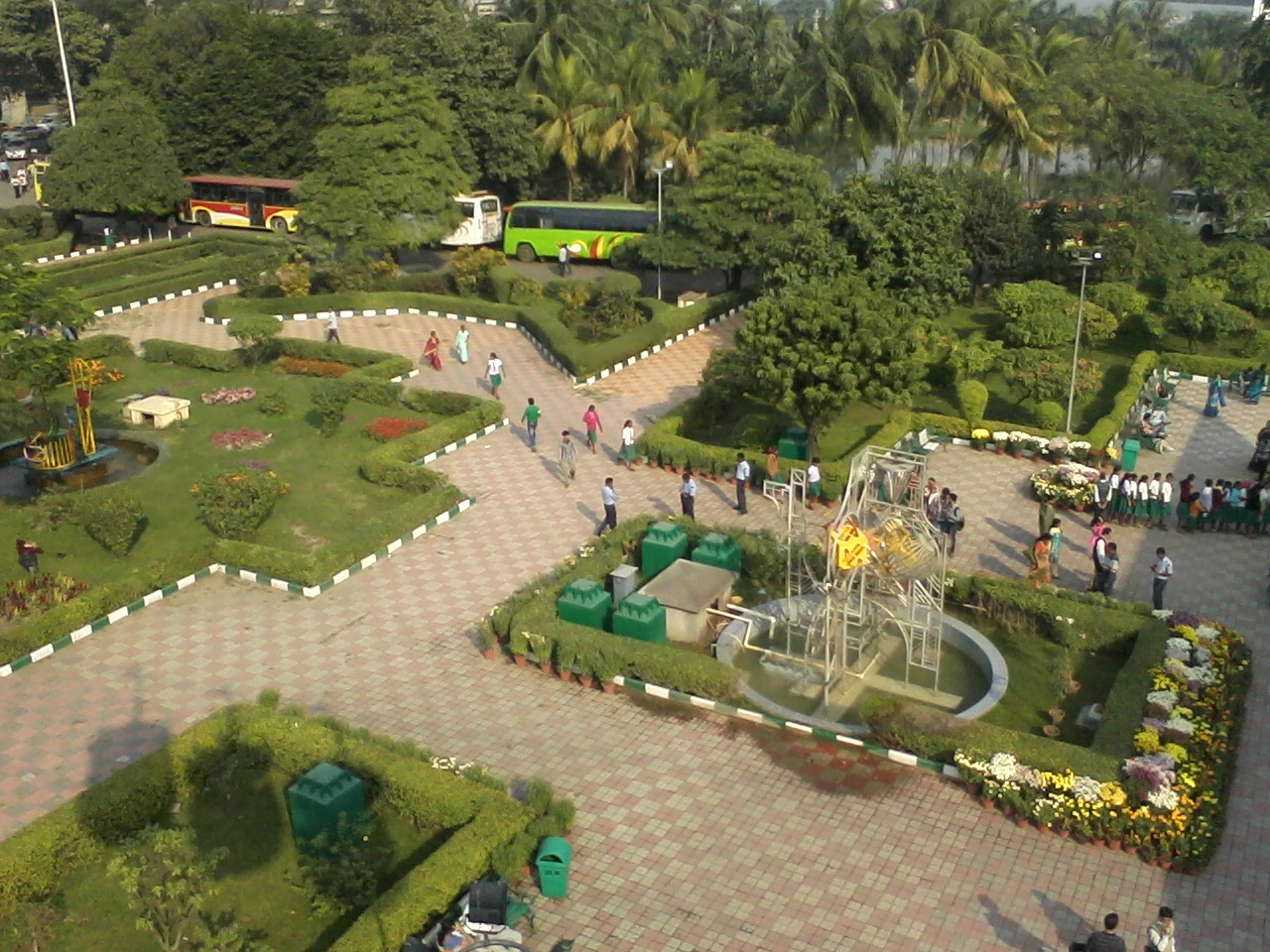
Science Park Kolkata

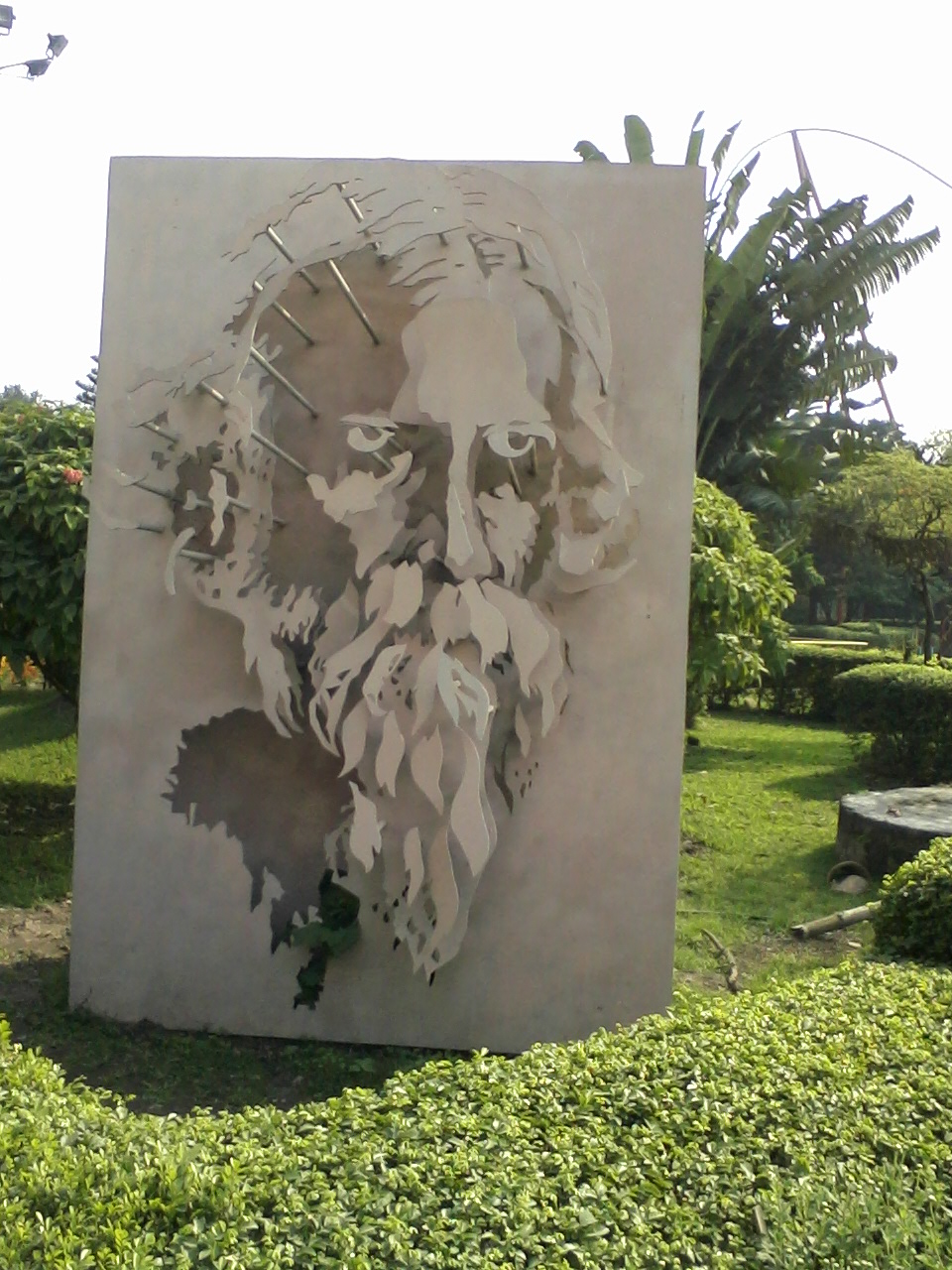
Rabindranath Tagore art in Science Park

== Science Exploration Hall ==
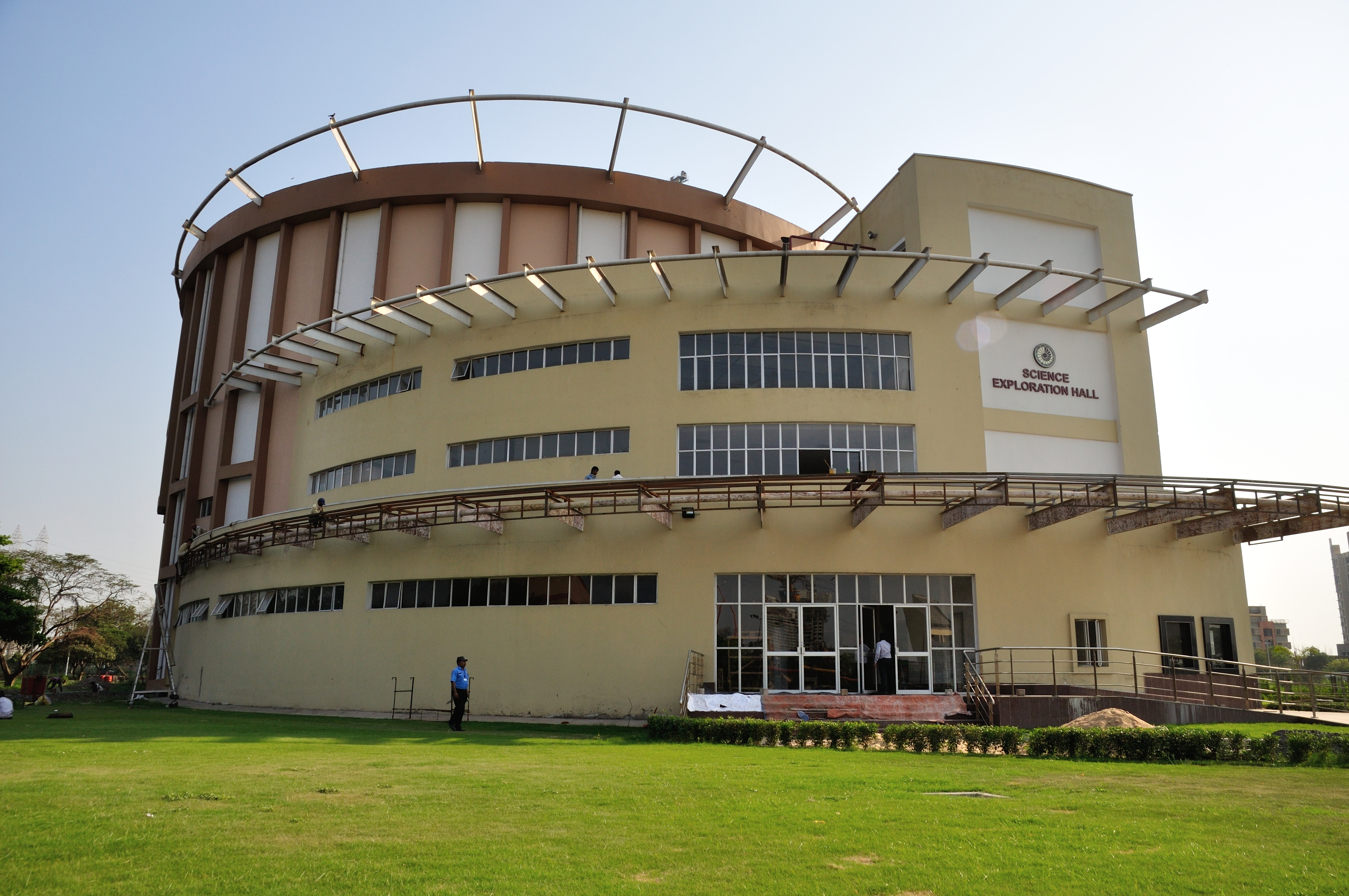
Science Exploration Hall

A 5400 square meter new building was opened in 2016. It provides inquiry based learning to visitors in four sections:

- Emerging Technologies
- Evolution of Life
- Panorama on Human Evolution
- Science and Technology Heritage of India
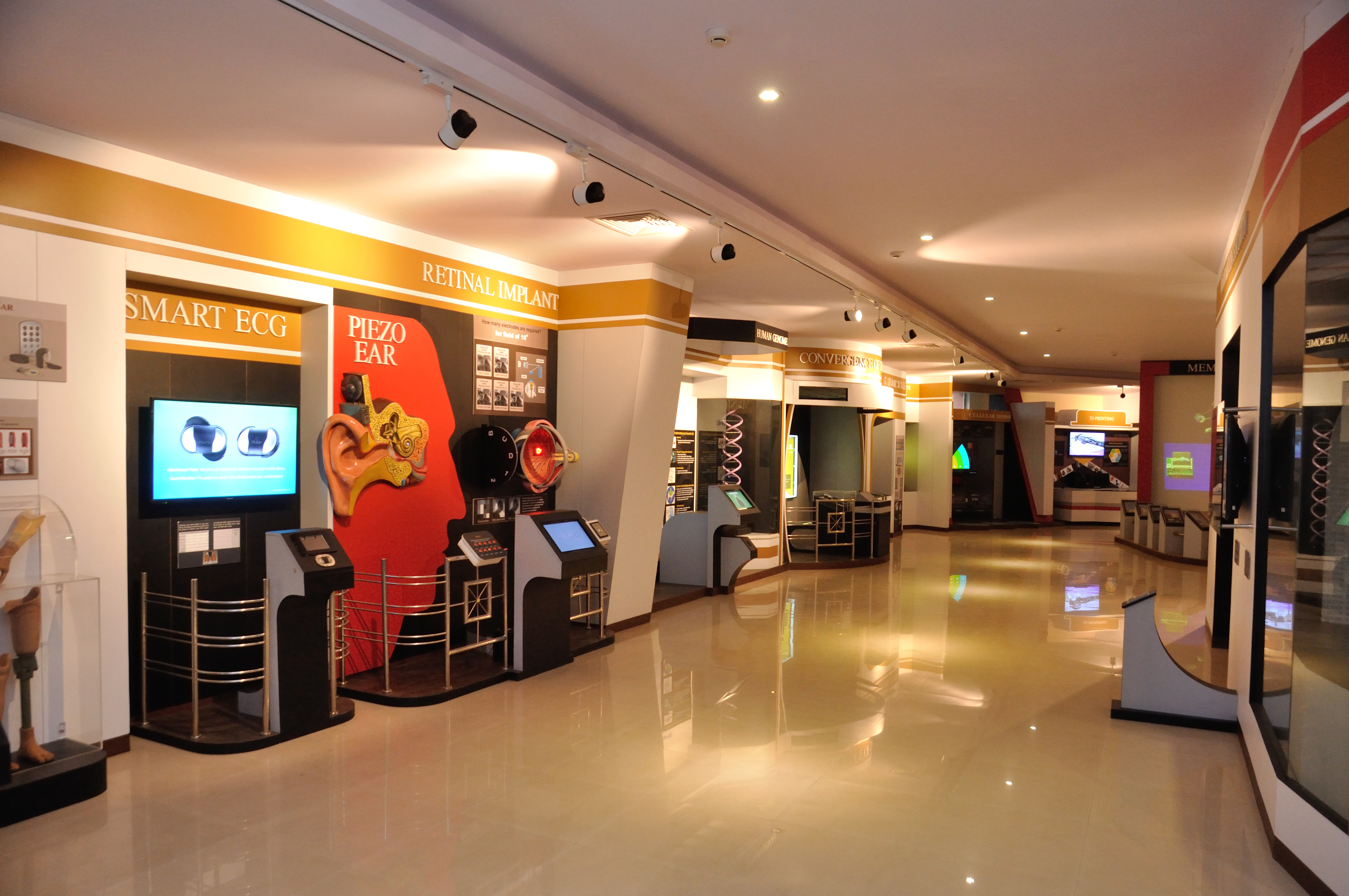
Emerging Technologies

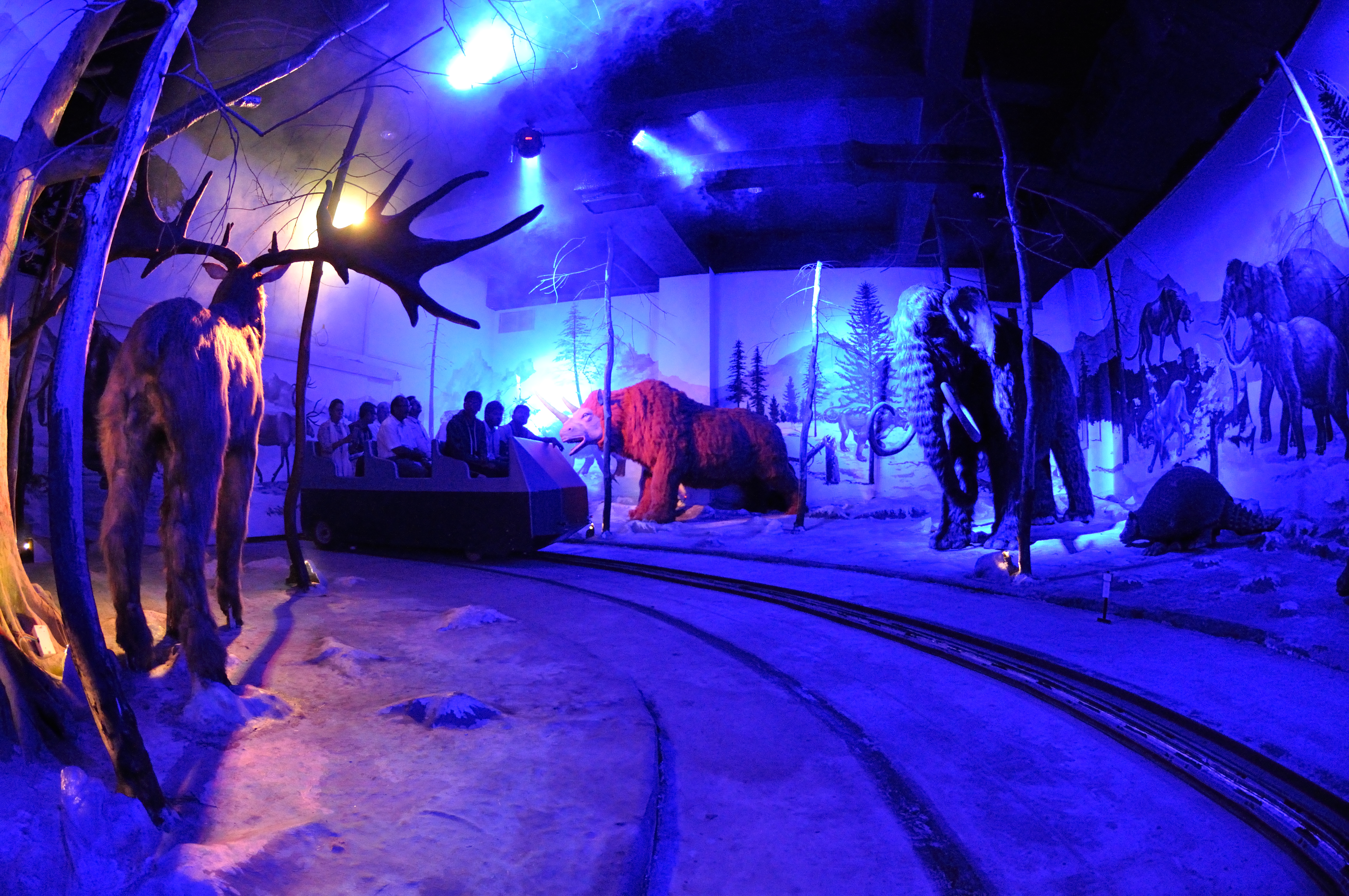
Evolution of Life

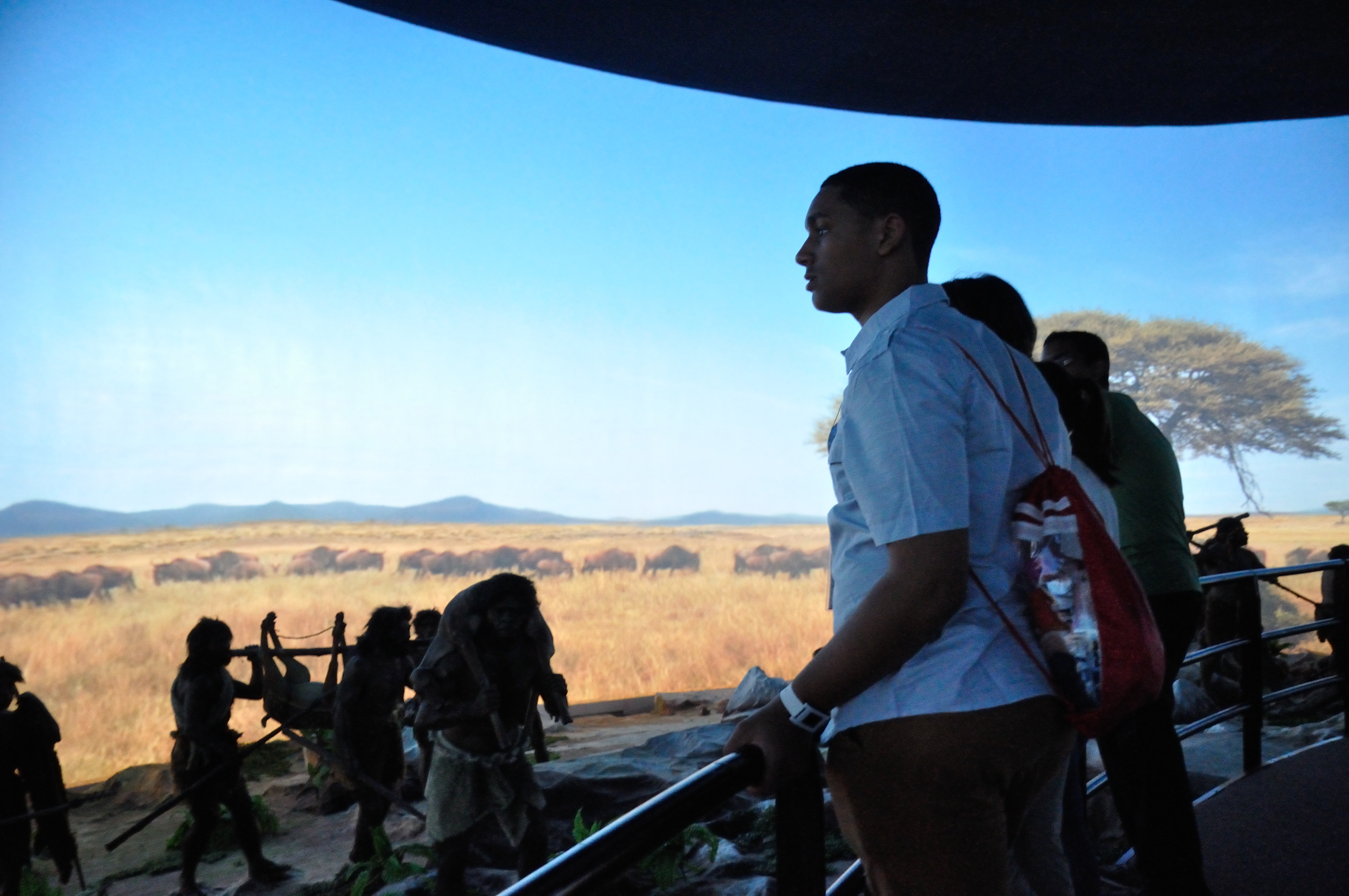
Panorama on Human Evolution

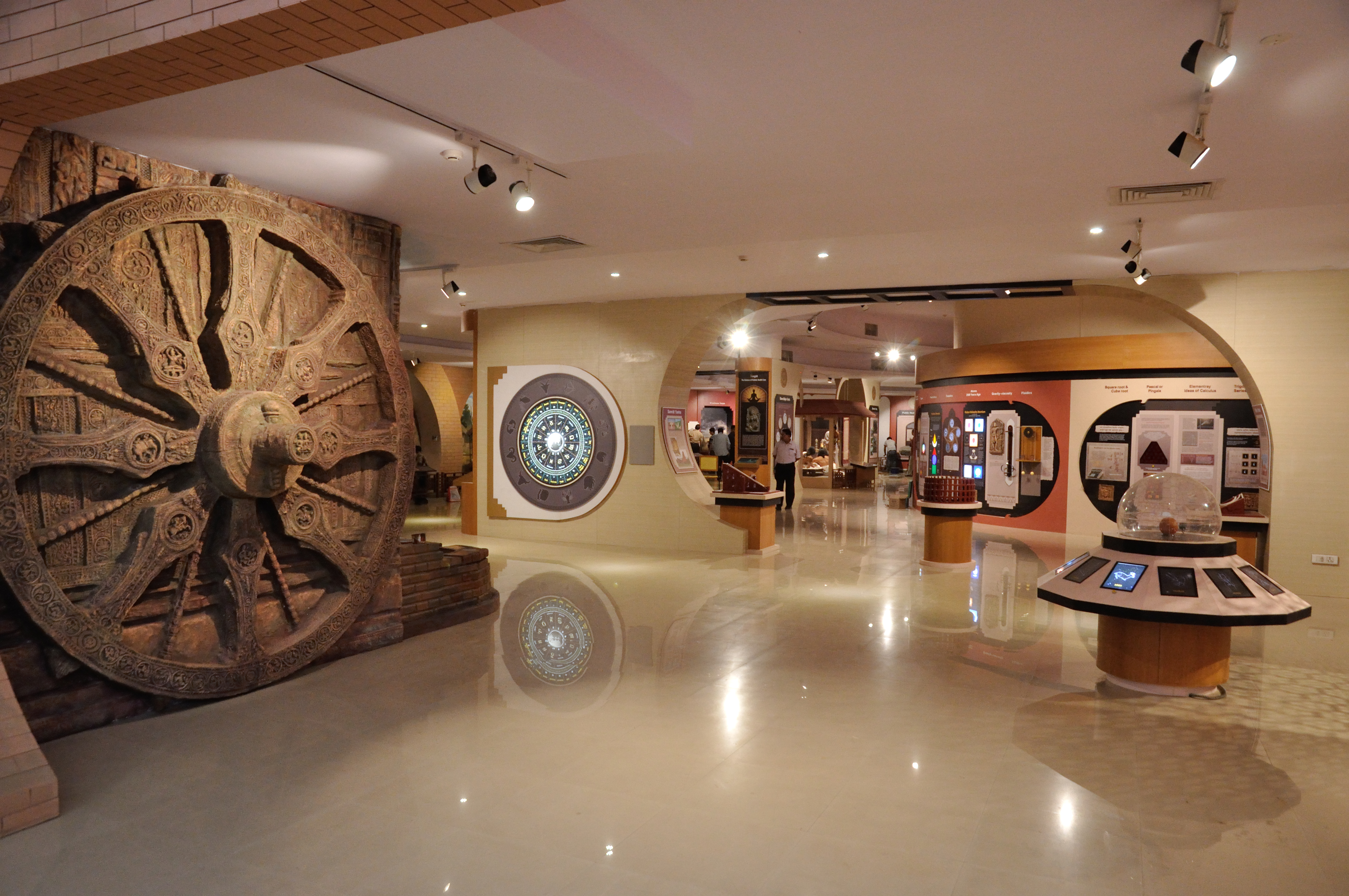
Science and Technology Heritage of India

== Other facilities ==
Convention Centre Complex

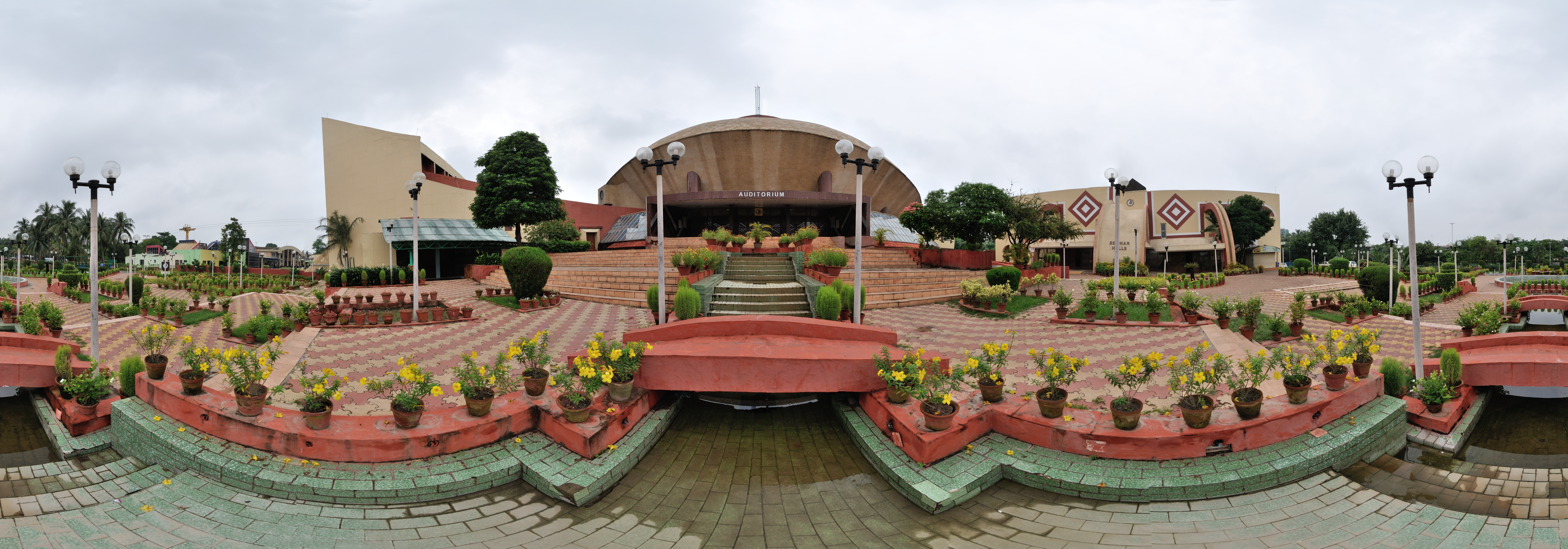
Convention Centre Complex. 360 degree view.

- Grand Theater: 2232 seating capacity main auditorium with a stage for 100 performers at a time, the largest auditorium in eastern India.
- Mini Auditorium: 392 seating capacity, with stage for 30 performers at a time, ideal for smaller conferences and shows.
- Seminar Building: Comprising eleven halls, four with seating capacity of 100 persons each, two with seating capacity of 40 persons each, two with seating capacity of 30 persons each, two with seating capacity of 15 persons, and a meeting room for 12 persons, a venue for conferences, seminars, meetings, and workshops.

== Transport ==
=== Bus ===
Bus Numbers - AS3, AC12, AC47, EB3, EB14, KB21, 24A/1, 42, 213.

=== Train ===
Park Circus railway station on Sealdah South lines is the nearest railway station.

=== Metro ===
Barun Sengupta metro station (also known as Science City), is an station of the Kolkata Metro Orange Line located at Parama Island in the Dhapa area of Kolkata, West Bengal, India, serving Dhapa, ITC Royal Bengal, JW Marriott and Science City areas. The station is named in honour of the founder of Bartaman, Barun Sengupta. The station is elevated above the Eastern Metropolitan Bypass.

== See also ==
- Swami Vivekananda Planetarium, Mangalore
- Pushpa Gujral Science City, Kapurthala, Punjab, India
- Gujarat Science City, Ahmedabad, Gujarat, India
- Science City at Union Station, Kansas City, Missouri, United States
- Science Centre, Surat
- Science City Chennai
- List of science centers#Asia
