= Tamil Nadu Civil Service =

Tamil Nadu Administrative Service
- தமிழ்நாடு நிர்வாக சேவை
- Tamil Nadu logo

Agency overview
- Formed: 1946
- Preceding agency: Madras Provincial Civil Service
- Jurisdiction: Tamil Nadu
- Agency executives: Shiv Das Meena IAS, Chief Secretary; S.K.Prabakar, IAS, Additional Chief Secretary / Commissioner of Revenue Administration
- Website: www.agaram.tn.gov.in/ias/

The Tamil Nadu Civil Service is the state administrative civil service cadre in the Indian state of Tamil Nadu. It is now known as Tamil Nadu Administrative Service (TNAS) (தமிழ்நாடு நிர்வாக சேவை). Recruitment for the service is based on the results of an annual combined competitive examination.

Although initial appointment is usually at a lower rank than Indian Administrative Service (IAS, one of the All India Services), TNAS officers may assume posts equivalent to IAS officers. They hold a variety of posts at the sub-district level, delivering government services apart from revenue administration and the maintenance of law and order.

== Recruitment ==
Vacancies in the TNAS occur annually due to retirement and IAS promotion to the Revenue Administration Disaster Management and Mitigation Department. Civil Servants are recruited to the Tamil Nadu Administrative Service in two ways: directly, through the TNPSC Group 1 Exam organized by the Tamil Nadu Public Service Commission, and by Transfer from the Tamil Nadu Revenue Subordinate Service or other organizations. The exam, conducted over an 11-month period, has three phases: preliminary, main and interview. Subjects include general knowledge, general science, English, management, statistics, civil engineering, Indian history, law, mathematics, political science and international relations, public administration and computer science.

== Authority ==
The Additional Chief Secretary (Commissioner) of Revenue Administration has authority over TNAS officers in training, appointment, promotion, posting and transfer and retirement. Additional authority is vested in the Tamil Nadu Public Service Commission, the Government of Tamil Nadu, the Department of Revenue and the Department of Personnel and Administrative Reforms.

== Training and appointment ==
After recruitment TNAS candidates undergo training at the Anna Institute of Management, and probationary officers are appointed after the training period. After the probationary period they are appointed deputy collectors, followed by district revenue officers after six years of experience. Officers with good performance have a rank equivalent to the IAS. The retirement age is 58.

== Acts and rules ==
- Special Rules for the Tamil Nadu Administrative Service
- Tamil Nadu Revenue Subordinate Service Rules
- Tamil Nadu Government Employees Conduct Rules, 1973

== See also ==
- Civil Services of Tamil Nadu
- Government of Tamil Nadu
- Tamil Nadu Revenue Department
- Tamil Nadu Revenue Administration Disaster Management and Mitigation Department
