= Pushpa Gujral Science City, Kapurthala =

Science centre in Kapurthala, Punjab, India

Pushpa Gujral Science City Kapurthala
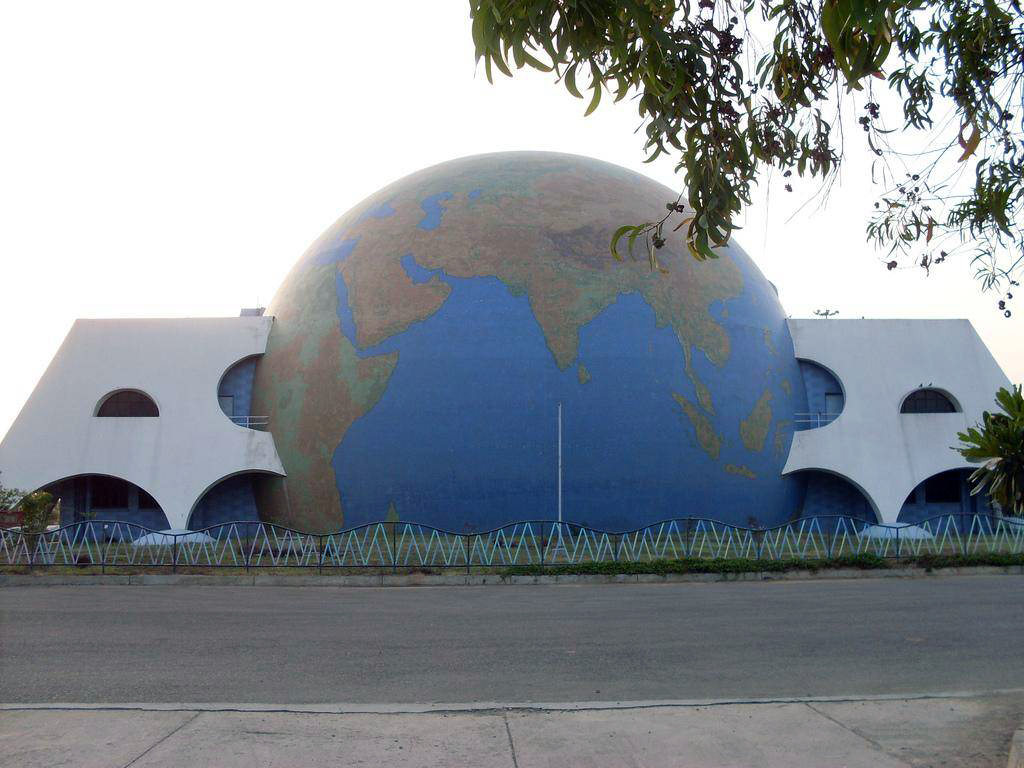
- Pushpa Gujral Science City - Outside View of IMAX Theater
- Formation: 19 March 2005
- Type: Science Centre
- Legal status: Government
- Purpose: Educational
- Headquarters: Kapurthala
- Location: India
- Region served: Punjab, India
- Director: Dr. Neelima Jerath
- Parent organisation: Government of Punjab, India
- Website: pgsciencecity.org

The Pushpa Gujral Science City or PGSC is located on outskirts of Kapurthala on the Kapurthala-Jalandhar road. The foundation stone of PGSC was laid by the then prime minister Inder Kumar Gujral on 17 October 1997. The science city has been named after mother of Inder Kumar Gujral and jointly funded by Government of India and the Punjab Government. The first director general of PGSC, Raghbir Singh Khandpur has been credited with having conceptualised this centre.

== Facilities ==
- Galleries
- Science Voyage Hall
- Theatre
- Energy Park
- Mobile Science van

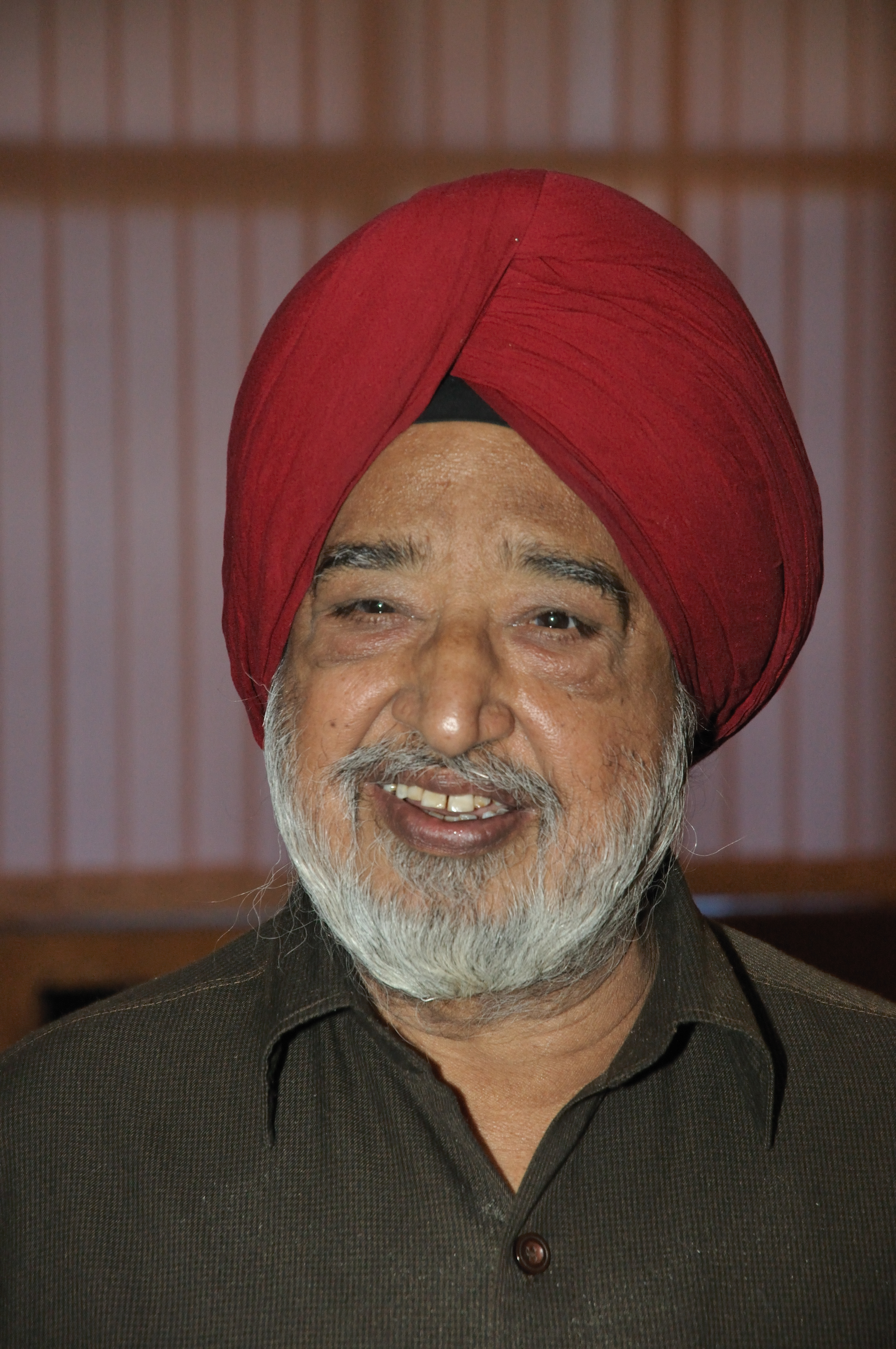
First Director General, PGSC, Kapurthala

== See also ==
- Science City Kolkata
