= Tamil Nadu Minerals Limited =

Tamil Nadu Minerals Limited (TAMIN)
- Native name: தமிழ் நாடு கனிம நிறுவனம் (டாமின்)
- Company type: A Government of Tamil Nadu Undertaking
- Industry: Minerals, stones quarrying
- Founded: 1978
- Headquarters: Chennai, Tamil Nadu, India
- Area served: Tamil Nadu
- Website: tamingranites.com

Tamil Nadu Minerals Limited (TAMIN) (Tamil: தமிழ் நாடு கனிம நிறுவனம் (டாமின்)) is a state-government undertaking of Government of Tamil Nadu located in the Indian state of Tamil Nadu. It is the authority and contractor of granite and stone quarries in Tamil Nadu. TAMIN received the national e-governance award for developing Quarry Management System (QMS) at the 18th national e-governance conference held at Gandhi Nagar in Gujarat 2015.

== TAMIN operation ==
- Granite processing factories at Manali (near Chennai) and Madhepalli (near Krishnagiri)
- Graphite Mines & Beneficiation Plant around Sivagangai
- Mining and processing Vermiculite, a non-metallic versatile mineral at Sevathur Village, Thirupathur Taluk, Vellore District
