= Embassy of India, Belgrade =

Diplomatic mission of India to Serbia

- Location: Belgrade, Serbia
- Address: Đorđa Radojlovića 7a
- Ambassador: Abhishek Shukla
- Website: Official website

The Embassy of India in Belgrade is the diplomatic mission of India to Serbia. The ambassador is Abhishek Shukla. India doesn't recognise the territory of Kosovo, and instead regards the territory to be "an integral part of Serbia" and serves its jurisdiction.

Presently, Abhishek Shukla is the Ambassador, he joined the office on 8th January 2026. The current address of the Embassy is 41 Bulevar Kneza Aleksandar Karadordevica, Belgrade.

== Activities ==
The embassy engages in various activities for locals, and also promotes doing business as well.

== See also ==
- India–Serbia relations
- India–Kosovo relations
- India's reaction to the 2008 Kosovo declaration of independence
- Foreign relations of Kosovo
- Foreign relations of Serbia
- Foreign relations of India
- List of diplomatic missions in Serbia
- List of diplomatic missions of India
