= Vibrant Gujarat Global Summit =

Biennial investors' summit in Gujarat, India

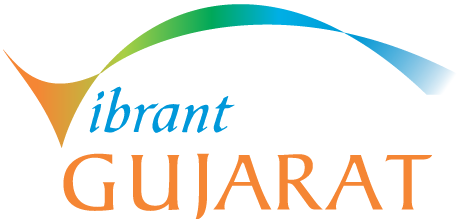
- Logo of Vibrant Gujarat Global Summit

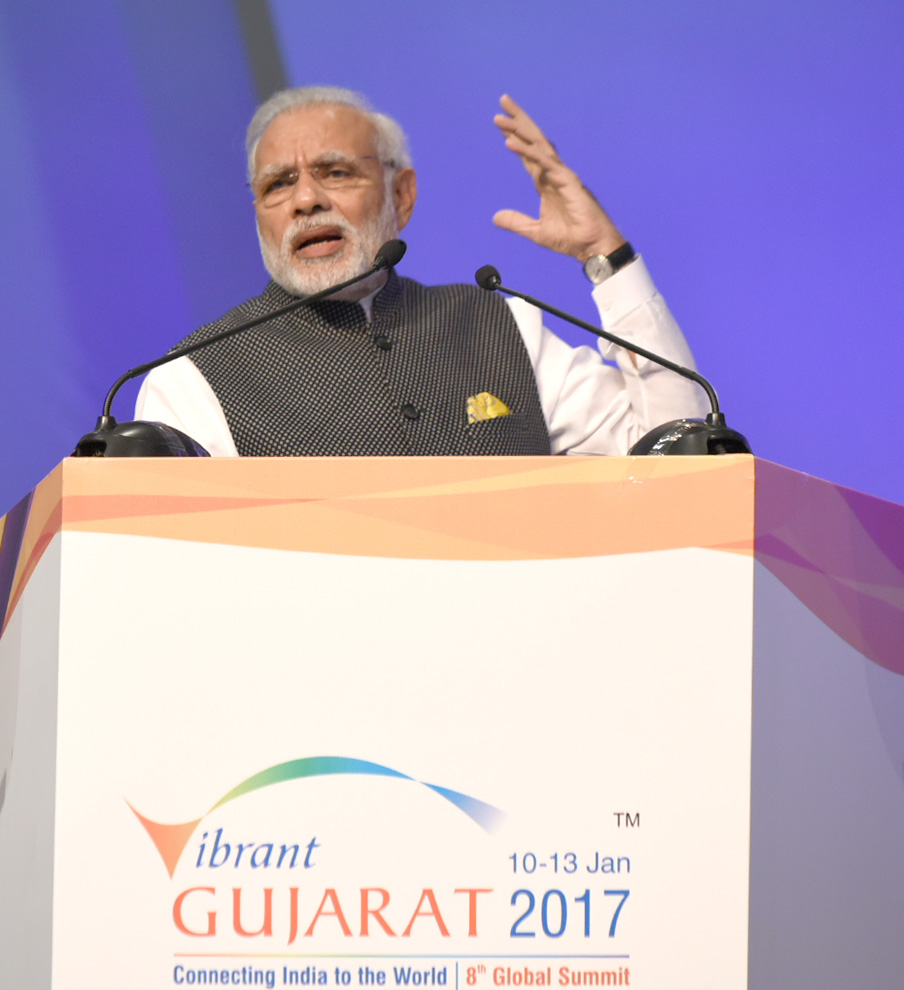
- Prime Minister, Shri Narendra Modi addressing at the Vibrant Gujarat Global Summit 2017
- Frequency: 2 years
- Locations: Mahatma Mandir, Gandhinagar, India
- Years active: 20
- Inaugurated: 2003
- Most recent: 2024
- Previous event: 2024
- Next event: 2027
- Participants: 45000
- Patron: Government of Gujarat
- Organiser: iNDEXTb
- Website: vibrantgujarat.com

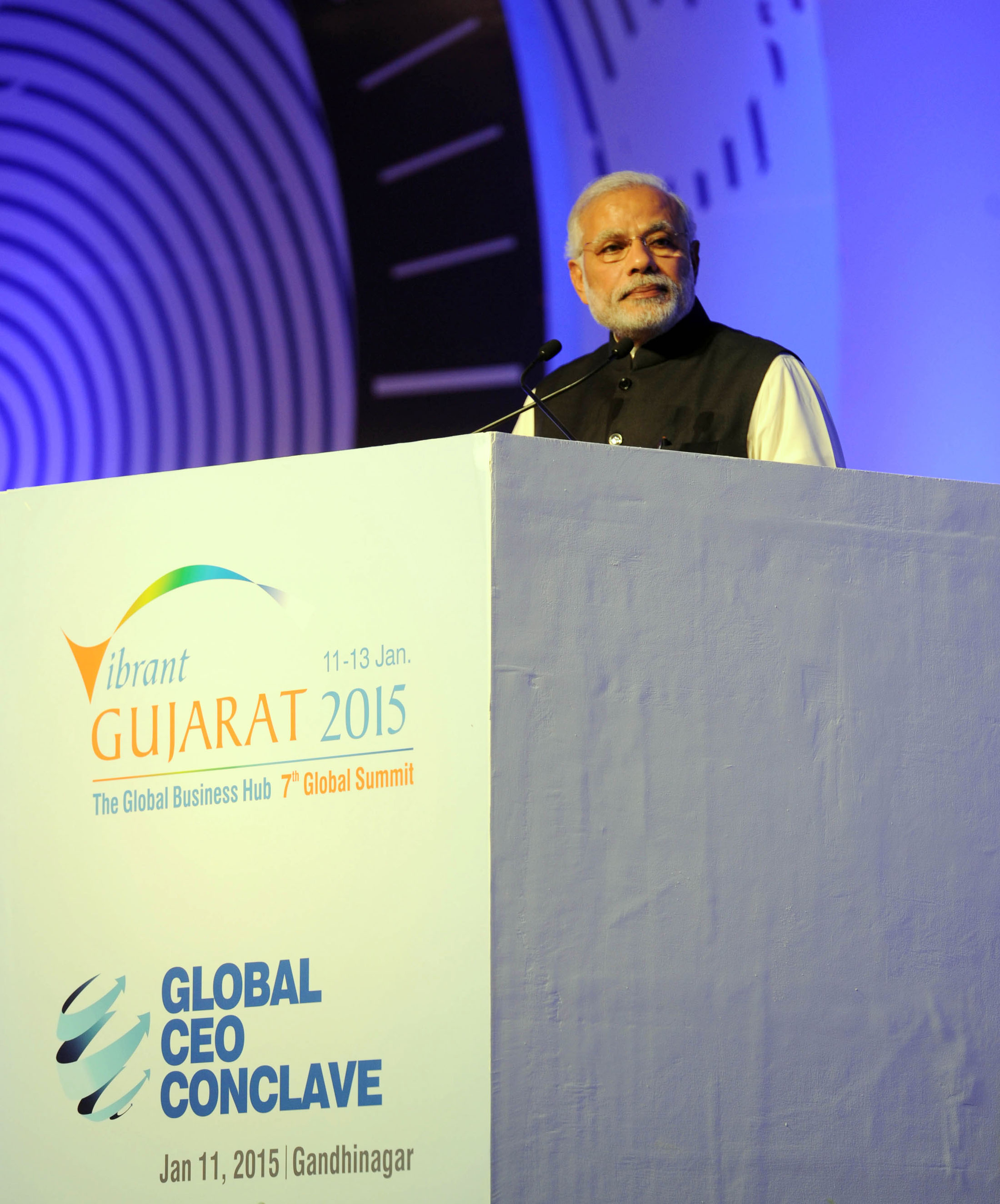
Prime Minister Narendra Modi speaking at the Vibrant Gujarat Summit 2015.

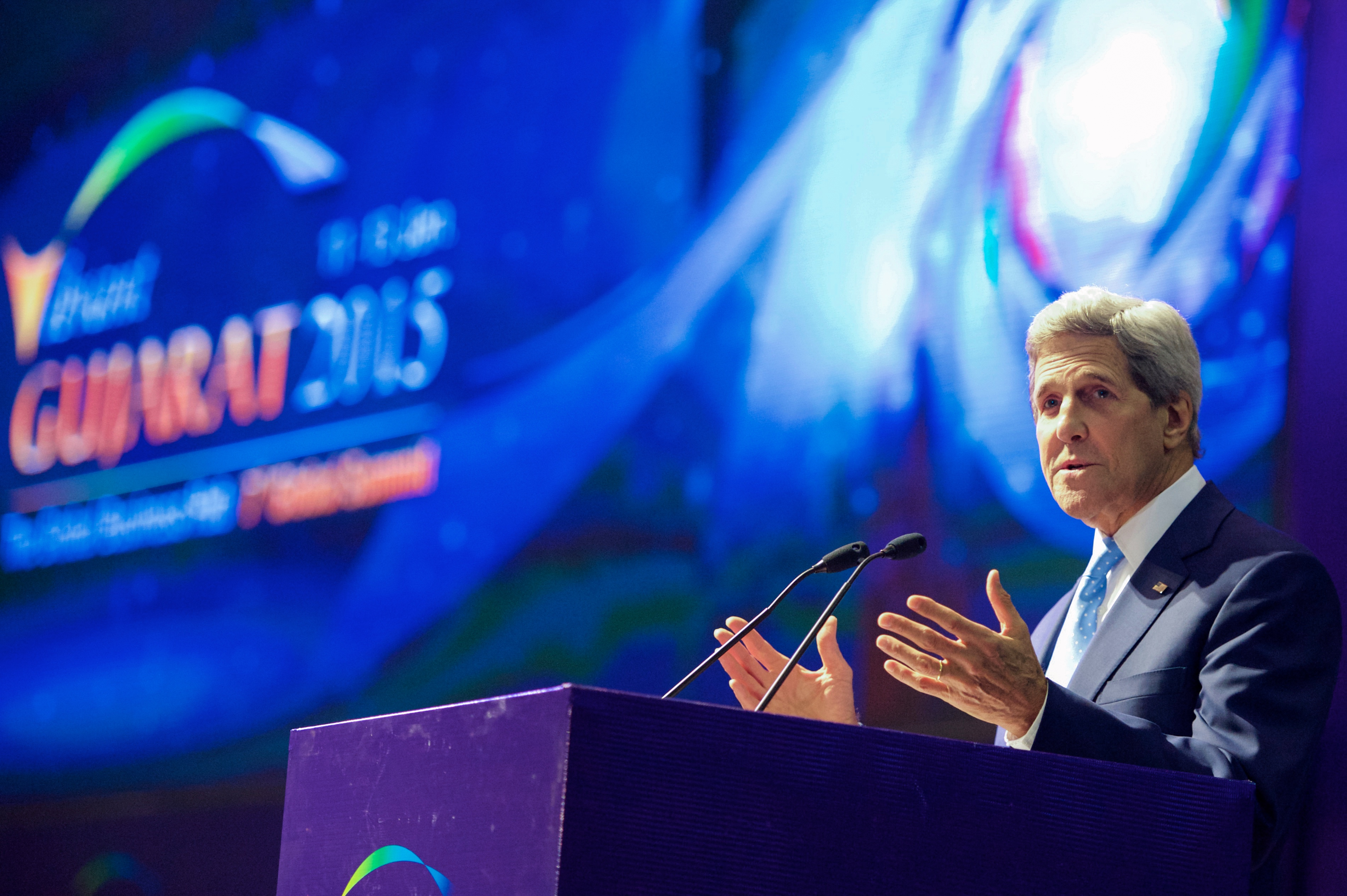
US Secretary of State John Kerry addresses attendees at Vibrant Gujarat Summit 2015.

Vibrant Gujarat, also referred to as Vibrant Gujarat Global Summit, is a biennial investors' global business event that is held in the state of Gujarat, India. The event is aimed at bringing together business leaders, investors, corporations, thought leaders, policy and opinion makers; the summit is advertised as a platform to understand and explore business opportunities in Gujarat. The summit's primary objective is to promote Gujarat as an attractive investment destination and to facilitate partnerships and collaborations across different sectors. Summit began in 2003 and is now held every two years.

The Vibrant Gujarat Global Summit was first launched in 2003 by then Chief minister of Gujarat Narendra Modi, and over the years, it has evolved into one of Gujarat's most important economic forums. It is organized by the Government of Gujarat and supported by various industry associations, both at the national and international levels. The summit's primary objective is to promote Gujarat as an attractive investment destination and to facilitate partnerships and collaborations across different sectors. The primary objective of the summit is to create a platform where business leaders, policymakers, and investors to explore opportunities for investment, collaboration, and partnership in various sectors of the economy. The event is structured to facilitate discussions, negotiations, and agreements in sectors such as energy, manufacturing, infrastructure, information technology, agriculture, healthcare, and more. During the Vibrant Summit series, thousands of MOUs were signed and billions of dollars were spent in Gujarat (2003–76 MOUs worth USD 14 billions, 2005–226 MOUs worth USD 20 billions, 2007–675 MOUs worth USD 152 billions, 2009–8662 MOUs worth USD 243 billions, 2011–7936 MOUs worth USD 462 billions).

== History ==
=== 2003 ===
1st Vibrant Gujarat Global Investors' Summit was organized during the Navratri festival in 2003 by then-Chief Minister of Gujarat Narendra Modi. The Industrial Extension Bureau acted as a nodal agency for the State Government during Vibrant Gujarat: Global Investors Summit (28 September to 2 October 2003) organized at the two major commercial cities of the State–Ahmedabad and Surat in association with the Government of India, United Nations Industrial Development Organization (UNIDO), Federation of Indian Chambers of Commerce & Industry (FICCI) & CII.

The conventions during the programme had sectoral sessions focus sector – Industrial Investment, Agro-Processing, Biotech- Pharma, Natural Gas and Oil, Infrastructure, Mining, Tourism, Apparels and Gems-Jewellery at Ahmedabad and sectoral sessions on Garment & Textiles and Gems & Jewellery at surat . There were also exhibitions in above sectors at respective places in Ahmedabad and Surat to provide a platform for showcasing products and services. One-to-one discussions between the prospective investors, government officials and the project promoters took place.

The Deputy Prime Minister of India, Lal Krishna Advani inaugurated Vibrant Gujarat: Global Investors’ Summit 2003 on 28 September 2003. Chief Minister Narendra Modi, Arun Shourie, Ram Naik, Mukesh Ambani, and A C Muthaih were the other dignitaries present on the dais. Various sessions during the programme were chaired by other ministers from the Union and State Government. Other events organized during Navratri festival were International Convention on Reconstruction in Kutch District after earthquake in 2001 and Celebration of Birth Anniversary of Mahatma Gandhi at Porbandar–the birthplace of Mahatma Gandhiji on his birthday anniversary on 2 October 2003.

About 1,000 business delegates, 125 foreign delegates, 200 Non-Resident Indians, 200 leading dignitaries and other participants from about 45 countries participated in Navratri festival. A large number of corporate leaders like Subhir Raha, C K Birla, CEOs of multinational companies like Shell, British Gas, General Motors, P&O ports, Niko & Steag and others attended the event. International dignitaries like Larry Pressler, ex-US Senator; Michael Clarke graced the occasion.

MoUs, IEMs, and concrete business plans in the form of proposals worth ₹55,000 crore were registered with the government. These proposals were submitted in a variety of industries, including electricity, oil and gas, petrochemicals, tourism, biotechnology, agro-foods, research, gems and jewelry, and technical education. 176 project proposals were compiled and were then scrutinized for their viability. Internationally reputed credit rating agencies like CRISIL and CARE lend their support as the financial advisors to these projects. Leading private and public sector banks of India like ICICI, IDBI, State Bank of India, Bank of Baroda, State Bank of Saurashtra, Corporation Bank, IDFC and NABARD have extended their support for financing these projects. CRISIL also worked with iNDEXTb in structuring these projects. At the end of the event, 76 memorandums of understanding (MoU) worth US$14 billion for investment were signed.

=== 2005 ===
2005 Vibrant Gujarat Global Investor's Summit was a two-day event organized in India. It started with the Vice President of India, Bhairon Singh Shekhawat, inaugurating the ceremony. More than 6,000 people attended the inaugural ceremony. The dignitaries present at the ceremony included industry representatives, foreign multinationals, NRIs as well as the business from various sections of the society, India. Mukesh Ambani of Reliance Industries, Gautam Adani of the Adani Group, Shashi Ruia of Essar, Nigel Shaw of British Gas and so on. MoUs for setting up projects worth ₹870 Billion were signed on the first day itself.

To invite participation from global players, five delegations Led by senior Ministers of Gujarat Cabinet visited different parts of the world to hold discussions with NRIs, NRGs (Non Residential Gujaratis) and foreign investors. From amongst them, several investors and NRIs participated in the event. The summit was planned to coincide with Gujarat's famous Kite festival, Uttarayan, which marks a change of season with the movement of the sun into the northern hemisphere. Sectoral theme pavilions showcasing the strength of Gujarat in the relevant areas were developed. Major industries, Government corporations and Institutions participated in each sector. The event also hosted an exhibition along with seminars on the focus areas for investment in the state. These were IT, Biotech, Agro, Energy, Gas, Petroleum, Non-conventional Energy, Port & port-Led industries, Financial Services, Textiles and Apparels, Gems & Jewellery, Tourism etc. The exhibition was held at the Science City which have more than 200 exhibitors from various sectors. The exhibitions attracted visitors from within the state and outside.

On the first day, the focus sectors were Information Technology, Biotechnology, Agro, Energy, Gas, Petroleum and more importantly Non-conventional Sources of Energy. Seminars and meetings were held in three different halls at the Science City. Potential investors and industrialists had one-to-one meetings with senior officials of the state government and ministers of the cabinet. The concluding day maintained the same momentum and enthusiasm as that of the first day with MoUs being signed by Industry. Several new MoUs were signed in the focus sectors of the day–Agriculture, Engineering, Tourism, Urban Development, Chemicals and Pharmaceuticals, Port & Port Led development, Textiles, Gems & Jewellery. By the time the Summit concluded on the second day, investments worth INR 1060 Billion in the form of MoUs were signed with 226 units. The concluding ceremony was graced by the Union Minister for Commerce & Industry Shri Kamal Nath,

The 227 project proposals totaling ₹1.06 lakh crore that were submitted during the 2005 summit, 85 projects costing ₹65,000 crore are currently in the execution stage, and 84 projects with an investment of ₹23,000 crore have already entered production. Of these, twenty-four are in an advanced stage. 76 proposals totaling ₹66,000 crore were signed during the 2005 summit; of these, 29 projects worth ₹22,000 crore have entered production and 21 projects worth ₹39,000 crore are now being carried out.

=== 2007 ===
The Government of Gujarat hosted the 2007 Vibrant Gujarat Global Investors' Summit on 12 and 13 January at Ahmedabad. This was the third such Summit organized by the state government with the first Summit held in 2003 and the second held in 2005. The Vibrant Gujarat Global Investors’ Summit 2007 event was spread over a period of 4 days. On 10 January 2007, a multimedia exhibition-Eternal Gandhi–on life and philosophy of Mahatma Gandhi was inaugurated at Science city, Ahmedabad. On 11 January, an exhibition showcasing the strengths and advantages of the various industries in Gujarat named “Gujarat Discovered” and the International Kite festival at the Sabarmati Riverfront Development site was opened. 12 January saw the inauguration of Global Investors’ Summit at the Science city.

Events were attended by Ratan Tata, Mukesh Ambani, Kumarmangalam Birla, Anil Ambani, and Shashi Ruia. Investment bids totaling more than ₹4.5 lakh crore, spanning across several industries such as ports, power, textiles, agro-processing, biotechnology, and tourism, with the potential to generate over six lakh jobs, were selected.

=== 2009 ===
The Government of Gujarat organized the 4th biennial Global Investors' Summit during 12–13 January 2009. Based on the theme 'Gujarat Going Global' and aimed at bringing together business leaders, investors, corporations, thought leaders, policy and opinion makers; the summit served as a perfect platform to understand and explore business opportunities with the State of Gujarat.

Indian Businessmen, including Ratan Tata, Chairman, Tata Group, KV Kamath, Chairman ICICI and President CII, Mukesh Ambani, Chairman, Reliance Industries, Kumar Mangalam Birla, Chairman, Birla Group, Shashi Ruia, Chairman, Essar Group, Mr, Anil Ambani, Chairman, ADAG Group, Sunil Mittal, Chairman, Bharti Enterprise among several other dignitaries. Several political dignitaries from various countries such as Japan, UK, China, Russia, Canada, Israel, Poland, Korea, UAE, Malawi, Indonesia, Oman, Kenya, Italy, Singapore, Trinidad & Tobago, Vietnam, Uganda, Zimbabwe and Maldives had participated. Japan was the Partner Country to this Summit. This being the first time any country has agreed to partner with a State of another country. Japan External Trade Organisation (JETRO) was designated as the partner organization. Japan also reciprocated Gujarat's initiatives for mutual economic cooperation by sending two senior level delegations, led by Hideaki Domichi, the Ambassador of Japan to India and Heizo Takenaka, Former Minister of Economic & Fiscal Policy of Japan. The maximum number of delegates was from Japan, totalling to over 70 members.

During the course of two days, 8500 MoUs worth US$243 billion (over ₹12,000 lakh crore) are signed. The summit witnessed participation of delegates from 45 countries, amounting to over 600 foreign delegates.

=== 2011 ===
Vibrant Gujarat 2011 Summit was held at Gandhinagar on 12–13 January 2011. It is to be held at a special site dedicated for Vibrant Gujarat named Mahatma mandir situated at Gandhinagar sector 13. About 7936 MoUs were signed worth $462 billion in the two days.

=== 2013 ===
Vibrant Gujarat 2013 Summit was held for the second time in Gandhinagar on 12–13 January 2013 Mahatma mandir. Besides Gujarat it will also host a number of other Indian states like Karnataka and Developed and Developing Countries like Mozambique, Canada, United Kingdom, Japan.

=== 2015 ===
The 7th Vibrant Gujarat Summit was planned during 11 to 13 January 2015 at Mahatma Mandir, Gandhinagar, Gujarat, India. Six summits held so far had been a resounding success and immensely contributed to the transformation of Gujarat into a "Global Business Hub". The prime focus of Government of Gujarat was Inclusive development and the key areas for development identified included: Innovation, Sustainability, Youth & Skill Development, Knowledge Sharing and Networking. This Summit was an ideal platform for other states and countries to showcase their strengths, highlight business opportunities, facilitate knowledge dissemination etc.

Apart from Summit, Vibrant Gujarat is also known for the Trade Shows. Every year 2000+ Companies do participate in this exhibition, and around 1 million visitors participated in Vibrant Gujarat 2015.

Details about participation of prominent foreign dignitaries and their views about VG & Gujarat

Over 25,000 Delegates from India and 110 other countries participated in the 7th Vibrant Gujarat Summit 2015. Following are the dignitaries and diplomats who marked their presence in Vibrant Gujarat 2015:

- a. Mr. Narendra Modi, Hon’ble Prime Minister
- b. Mr. Tshering Tobgay, Hon’ble Prime Minister, Bhutan
- c. Mr. Nikola Gru`evski, Hon’ble Prime Minister, Republic of Macedonia
- d. Mr. Ban Ki Moon, Secretary General, United Nations
- e. Mr. John Kerry, Secretary of State, USA
- f. Mr. Jim Yong Kim, President, World Bank
- g. Mr. Sam Walsh, CEO, Rio Tinto, Australia
- h. Mr. Mukesh Ambani, Chairman, Reliance Industries Ltd.
- i. Mr. Kumar MangalamBirla, Chairman, Aditya Birla Group
- j. Mr. Ajaypal Singh Banga, President, USIBC
- k. Mr.Yosuke Takagi, Hon’ble State Minister, Ministry of Economy, Trade & Industry, Govt. of Japan

John Kerry, Secretary of State, USA, said, “PM Modi's Sabka Saath Sabka Vikas sounds like a pretty slogan for all of us to adopt.”

Jim Yong Kim, President, World Bank, said, “We believe India should be the leader in eliminating poverty; it's a radical and unique opportunity over the next decade.”

Mukesh Ambani, Chairman, Reliance Industries Ltd., said, “I urge each and every investor to follow our path and invest in Gujarat, just as we did.”

Tshering Tobgay, Hon’blePrime Minister, Bhutan, said, “I am here on my economic pilgrimage”

Sam Walsh, CEO, Rio Tinto, Australia, said, “We will add 30,000 Jobs in diamond cutting industry in Gujarat. Looking forward to impetus that Vibrant Gujarat will provide.”

Yosuke Takagi, Hon’bleState Minister, Ministry of Economy, Trade & Industry, Govt. of Japan, said, “Japan is incomplete without India, India is incomplete without Japan.”

=== 2017 ===
After organizing seven successful Summits, Government of Gujarat moved further in its journey towards sustainable long-term growth and inclusive development by organizing the 8th edition of Vibrant Gujarat Global Summit from 10 to 13 January 2017 at Mahatma mandir, Gandhinagar. The central focus of the 8th edition of the Vibrant Gujarat Global Summit was “Sustainable Economic and Social Development”. The Summit brought together Heads of States and Governments, Ministers, Leaders of the Corporate World, Senior Policy Makers, Heads of International Institutions and Academia from around the world to further the cause of development and promote cooperation.

Gujarat Chief Minister Vijay Rupani declared conclusion of the 8th edition of Vibrant Gujarat Global Summit, at Mahatma Mandir on 12 January 2017, on a politically confident note, by inviting all the guests for the next edition of the biennial event in January 2019 even as the state is scheduled to go for assembly elections in 2017. A total of 25,578 Memorandum of Understanding (MoUs) were declared to have been signed by different industrial units. Out of the signed MOUs, 18,533 were from MSME sector, 5,938 from the large-scale sector and 1,107 MOUs were for strategic and technological partnership sector. However, the number of the total worth of MOUs was not declared.

=== 2019 ===
9th Vibrant Gujarat Global Summit is scheduled on 18–20 January 2019. Vibrant Gujarat Global Summit 2019 (VGGS) expects to see commitment of investments worth a whopping ₹50,000 crore in the renewable energy sector in the state. This year United Arab Emirates, Uzbekistan & Morocco are the partner countries for 9th edition of Vibrant Gujarat. The venue for 9th Vibrant Gujarat Global Summit is Mahatma Mandir, Gandhinagar. Kiran vora Solvay S.A., is likely to sign ₹560-cr MoU for setting up Dahej plant. also MoU for country's first CNG terminal to be signed at Vibrant summit 2019. President of Uzbekistan Shavkat Mirziyoyev attended the Vibrant Gujarat international investment summit as a key guest in a first Central Asian country to participate as a country partner in the flagship investment summit of Gujarat.

=== 2024 ===
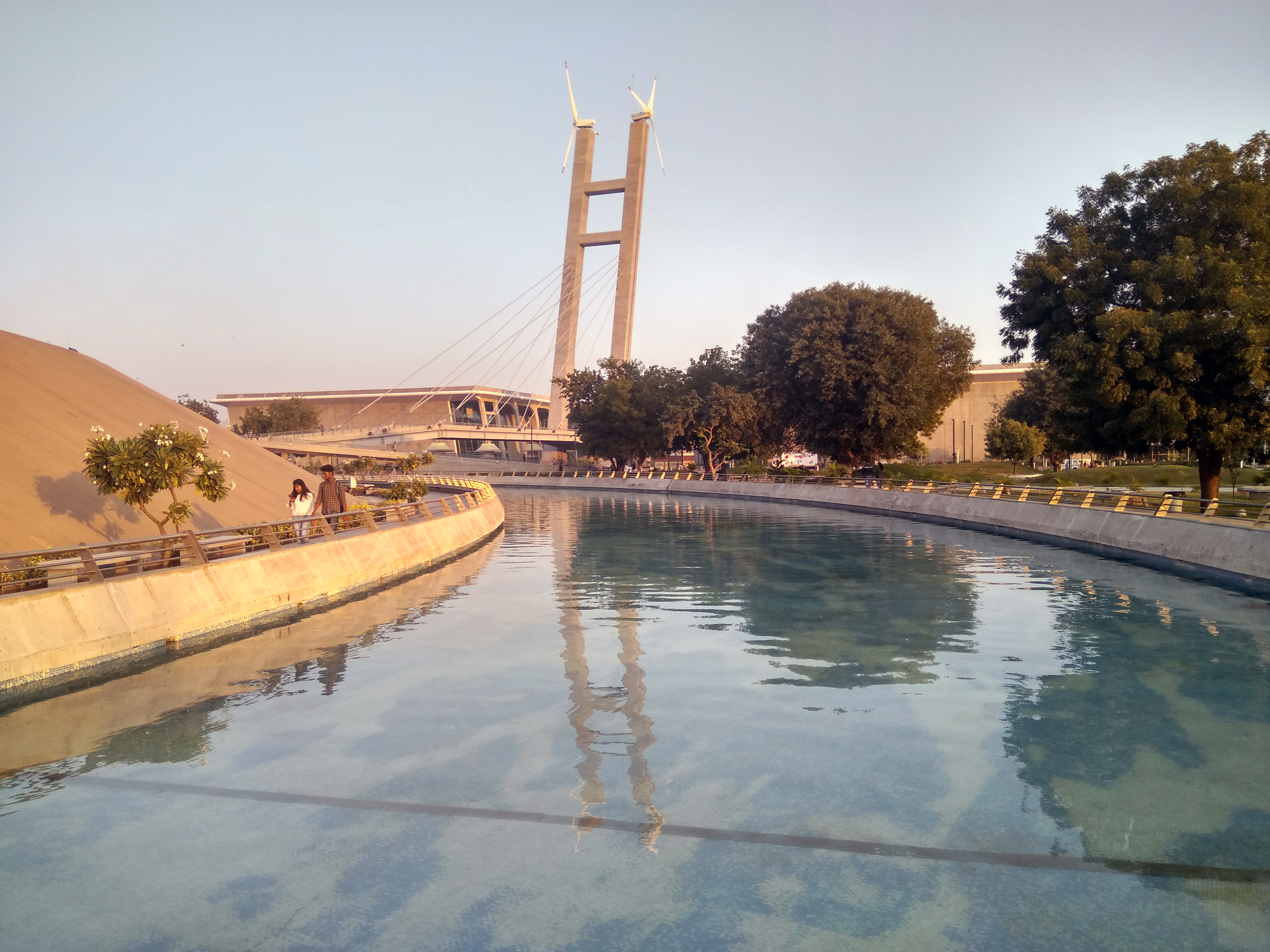
Mahatma Mandir (Summit Venue)

The 10th Vibrant Gujarat Global Summit (VGGS) was held from January 10 to 12, 2024, at Mahatma Mandir Convention and Exhibition Centre in Gandhinagar, Gujarat, India. The summit, organized by the Government of Gujarat in partnership with the Confederation of Indian Industry (CII) and iNDEXTb, focused on the theme "Gateway to the Future," bringing together global leaders, policymakers, and industry experts to discuss and explore opportunities for sustainable development, economic growth, and international cooperation.

The main focus of the Vibrant Gujarat Summit was on semiconductor, green hydrogen, space technology manufacturing, electric mobility, sustainable manufacturing, renewable energy, and Industry 4.0, said CM Bhupendra Patel. The journey of Vibrant Gujarat summit began in 2003 and was held every two years. In preparation for the summit, the Gujarat government conducted roadshows across India and the globe to promote the state's investment potential and attract global investors. These summits were held in major cities such as Mumbai, Delhi, Bangalore, Lucknow, Chennai, Kolkata, and Chandigarh, as well as in international cities like New Jersey, Dubai, Singapore, Tokyo, Frankfurt, Milan, Copenhagen, Paris, Ho Chi Minh City, and Seoul. As of right now, the state government reported that 28 nations and 14 organizations have confirmed to be partners in the summit. MoUs for 41,299 projects, with investment worth ₹26.33 lakh crore were signed during the event.

==== MoUs ====
- Pre-Summit MoUs: Gujarat had signed MoUs for proposed investments totaling ₹7,12,250 crores. These agreements estimated the creation of 3,70,165 direct and indirect employment opportunities.
- Summit MoUs: During the 10th edition of the Vibrant Summit, Gujarat signed the total investment commitment to more than ₹45 lakh crore across 98,540 projects.

KP Group and the Government of Gujarat signed an MoU to install 2.6+ GW of Solar, Wind & Hybrid power plants, as well as a green hydrogen plant in Gujarat. The estimated investment of 17,690 crore rupees and the creation of an estimated 13,750 jobs in Gujarat are anticipated by the year 2026.

== List of Summits ==
No	Year	Venue
1st	2003	Gujarat Science City
2nd	2005	Gujarat Science City
3rd	2007	Gujarat Science City
4th	2009	Gujarat Science City
5th	2011	Mahatma Mandir
6th	2013	Mahatma Mandir
7th	2015	Mahatma Mandir
8th	2017	Mahatma Mandir
9th	2019	Mahatma Mandir
10th	2024	Mahatma Mandir

== See also ==
- Madhya Pradesh Global Investors' Summit
- Tamil Nadu Global Investors Meet
- Make In Maharashtra
- Make in India
