= India–Kosovo relations =

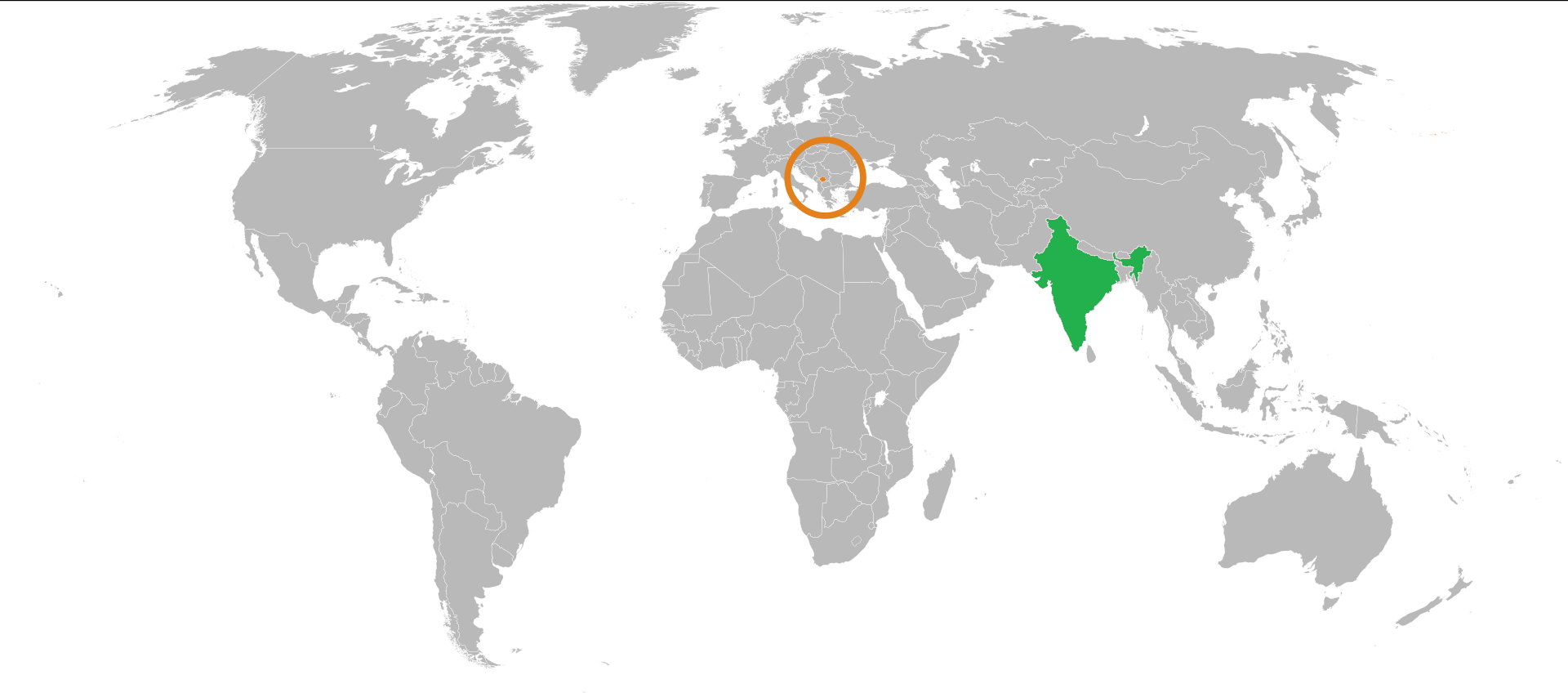
- India: Kosovo

India and Kosovo do not have official relations as India has not formally recognized Kosovo.

== Kosovo dispute ==
When Kosovo issued independence from Serbia in 2008, India was one of the countries that did not recognize the independence of Kosovo. In January 2009, Ajay Swarup stated that "India will support Serbia on the issue of protection of her sovereignty in all international forums".

The row between the two started in 2018 when the Indian government refused to give a visa to Donjeta Sadiku and her coaches to compete in a boxing competition despite getting the full backing of the Boxing Federation of India and the Indian Olympic Association. This prompted retaliation from the IOC as they threatened to revoke India's bids over 2030 Asian Games and 2032 Summer Olympics.

Despite this, India however, has maintained a pragmatic approach over Kosovo, which not recognizing but not denying Kosovo's existence, and several Kosovans have expressed their interest to experience official relations with India.

In November 2022, India-Kosovo Commercial Economic Office, a trade office independent of the Government of India and in association with the Ministry of Foreign Affairs of Kosovo, was opened in New Delhi and is headed by a private citizen. Despite the opening of the office, Ministry of External Affairs of India spokesperson Arindam Bagchi reiterated in a statement that there would be no change in India's position of non-recognition of Kosovo's independence.

== See also ==
- Foreign relations of India
- Foreign relations of Kosovo
- India–Serbia relations
- India–Yugoslavia relations
- India's reaction to the 2008 Kosovo declaration of independence
