= India–North Macedonia relations =

- India: North Macedonia

Bilateral relations exist between India and North Macedonia.

== History ==
India co-sponsored the United Nations General Assembly Resolution to admit North Macedonia to the United Nations. Diplomatic and consular relations between India and Republic of Macedonia were established on 9 February 1995. the Republic of Macedonia appointed an Indian businessman in New Delhi to serve as Republic of Macedonia's Honorary Consul in 2006. The Embassy of Republic of Macedonia in New Delhi was opened on 7 October 2008. The Embassy was registered under the country's former constitutional name of Republic of Macedonia, rather than its United Nations reference, the Former Yugoslav Republic of Macedonia. India had officially referred to the country as the Republic of Macedonia, despite objection from Greece, before the Prespa agreement. North Macedonia appointed an Honorary Consul in Kolkata in 2009, and subsequently appointed Honorary Consuls in Mumbai, Chennai, and Bangalore. India appointed an Honorary Consul in Republic of Macedonia in 2008. The Embassy of India in Sofia, Bulgaria is jointly accredited to Republic of Macedonia.

Foreign Minister of Republic of Macedonia Antonio Milososki visited India in January 2009, becoming the first government official of Republic of Macedonia to visit the country. Prime Minister of Republic of Macedonia Nikola Gruevski, accompanied by Deputy Prime Minister and Finance Minister Zoran Stavreski and several other ministers, visited India in March 2012 becoming the first Prime Minister of Republic of Macedonia to visit the country. Stavreski, and several other ministers, visited the country again in October 2012. Gruevski, Stavreski and other ministers visited the country again in January 2015 to attend the Vibrant Gujarat and CII-Partnership Summits. National Assembly President Trajko Veljanoski led a parliamentary delegation on a visit to India in March 2013. Foreign Minister of North Macedonia Nikola Poposki visited New Delhi and Agra in December 2013. The two countries signed a Double Taxation Avoidance Agreement and an MoU on Cooperation between the Diplomatic Academy of the Ministry of Foreign Affairs of North Macedonia and the Foreign Service Institute during the visit on 17 December.

From India, the highest level visits to North Macedonia have been at the level of minister of state. Minister of State for External Affairs Preneet Kaur, and a CII business delegation, visited North Macedonia on 10–11 July 2012 becoming the first Indian minister to visit the country. Kaur met with Foreign Minister Nikola Poposki, Deputy Prime Minister and Finance Minister Zoran Stavrevski, and Chairman of the Committee on Foreign Policy Antonio Milososki.

Citizens of North Macedonia are eligible for scholarships under the Indian Technical and Economic Cooperation Programme and the Indian Council for Cultural Relations. Several diplomats from North Macedonia have also attended the Professional Course for Foreign Diplomats (PCFD) programme run by the Foreign Service Institute.

== Trade ==
Bilateral trade between India and North Macedonia totaled US$37.12 million in 2019–20. India exported $22.61 million worth of goods to North Macedonia, and imported $14.51 million. The main commodities exported by India to North Macedonia are organic chemicals, pharmaceuticals, textiles, vehicles, oil seeds, ceramic products, cement, iron, steel and electrical machinery. The major commodities imported by India from North Macedonia are ships, boats and floating structures, mineral fuels, mineral oils, iron and steel.

India and North Macedonia signed a Bilateral Investment Promotion and Protection Agreement on 17 March 2008.

Arcelor Mittal acquired a 90% stake in Balkan Steel in 2004. In September 2011, Mumbai-based fabric trader and garment manufacturer Bang Overseas Limited founded Bang & Scott DOO (North Macedonia), a wholly owned subsidiary of North Macedonia. Indian metal products manufacturer BRG Group signed an agreement with the Government of North Macedonia on 12 January 2016 to invest EUR31 million in the country. The factory in Porcelanka will employ 1,000 people and manufacture steel kitchenware for export. In December 2016, Indian cable manufacturer for the automotive industry Malhotra Cables announced that it would invest $10 million to establish a manufacturing plant in Skopje.

Sahara Group chief Subrata Roy visited North Macedonia in January, July and October 2013. He met with Prime Minister and announced plans to EUR invest 2.7 billion in the country. Despite allegations of fraud and debt against Sahara in India, the Government of North Macedonia portrayed Roy domestically as a businessman who wanted to help the poor Macedonians because "Mother Teresa helped a lot of poor people in India." His arrest in India in March 2014 was met with shock in North Macedonia.

== Cultural relations ==
Mother Teresa, who became an Indian citizen in 1951, was born in Skopje (in present-day North Macedonia) in 1910.

As of December 2016, there are 10 Indian citizens and people of Indian origin in North Macedonia. They hold senior managerial positions in ArcelorMittal Steel, or work in IT and other sectors.

== Resident diplomatic missions ==
- India is accredited to North Macedonia from its embassy in Sofia, Bulgaria, with a future embassy planned within North Macedonia's capital city, Skopje, following the visit of Droupadi Murmu in late July 2026.
- North Macedonia has an embassy in New Delhi.

== See also ==
- Foreign relations of India
- Foreign relations of North Macedonia
- India–Yugoslavia relations
- Yugoslavia and the Non-Aligned Movement
