= India–Slovenia relations =

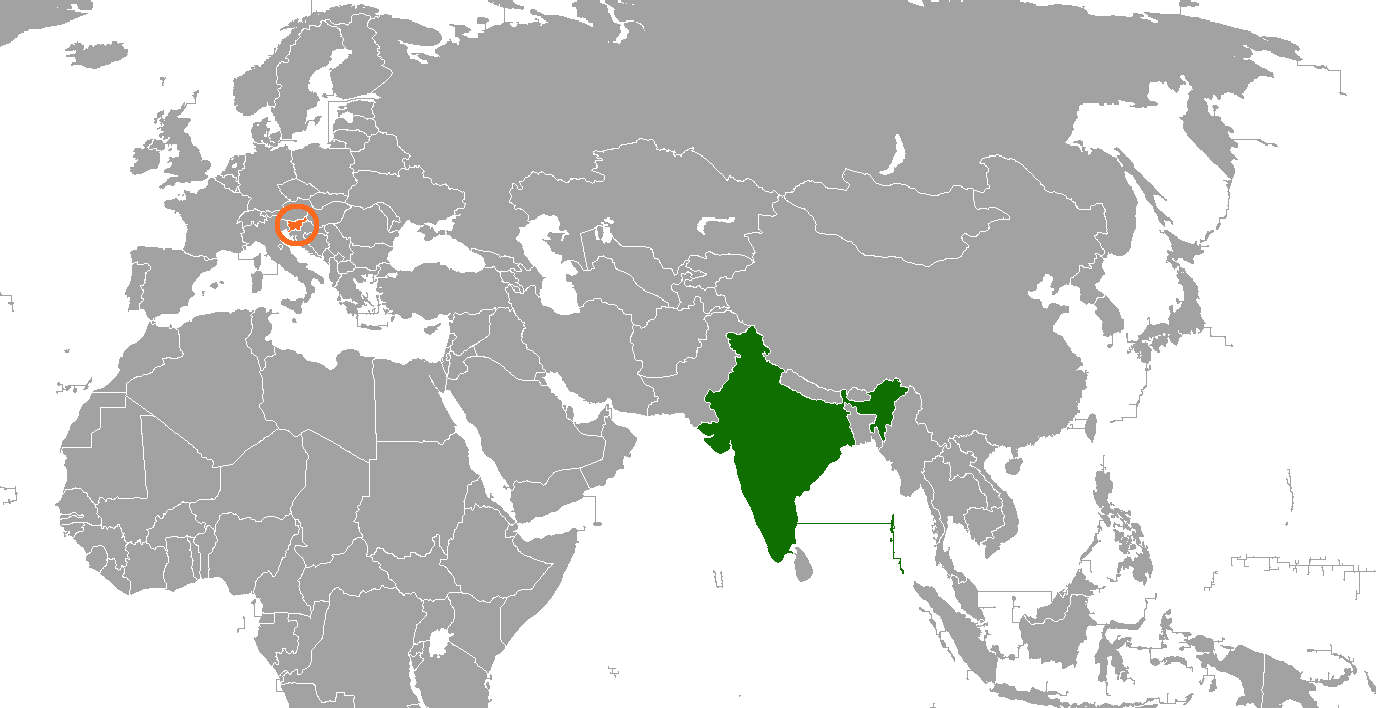

- India: Slovenia

India–Slovenia relations are the bilateral relations between India and Slovenia.

== History ==
India recognized Slovenia on 11 May 1992. Diplomatic relations were established on 18 May 1992 when Slovenian Foreign Minister Dimitrij Rupel visited India on 18 May 1992. Slovenia requested and received India's support for membership in the United Nations (UN), as well as guest membership in the Non-Aligned Movement. Slovenia was admitted to the UN on 23 May 1992.

Slovenia opened its embassy in New Delhi on 1 August 2002. The embassy was initially headed by a Chargé d'Affaires, but upgraded to Ambassador-level in September 2009. India opened its embassy in Ljubljana in February 2007. The first resident Indian Ambassador to Slovenia presented his credentials to the Slovene President on 1 March 2007. The chancery premises were officially inaugurated on 30 March 2007 during a visit by Foreign Minister Anand Sharma.

He also met with the Prime Minister and the Foreign Minister of India. Slovene President Danilo Tϋrk visited New Delhi in February 2010 and met with the Prime Minister. He also attended the 10th Delhi Sustainable Development Summit organised by TERI.

Slovenia opened four Consulates headed by Honorary Consuls in Kolkata, Mumbai, Chennai and Bangalore in 2011. Slovene Prime Minister Borut Pahor visited New Delhi, Mumbai and Bangalore in June 2011. He met with the President, Vice President, Prime Minister, Foreign Minister and Leader of the Opposition.

== Resident diplomatic missions ==
- India has an embassy in Ljubljana.
- Slovenia has an embassy in New Delhi.

== See also ==
- Foreign relations of India
- Foreign relations of Slovenia
- India–Yugoslavia relations
- Yugoslavia and the Non-Aligned Movement
