= 2024 Vibrant Gujarat Global Summit =

10th Vibrant Gujarat Global Summit

2024 Vibrant Gujarat Global Summit 10th Vibrant Gujarat Global Summit
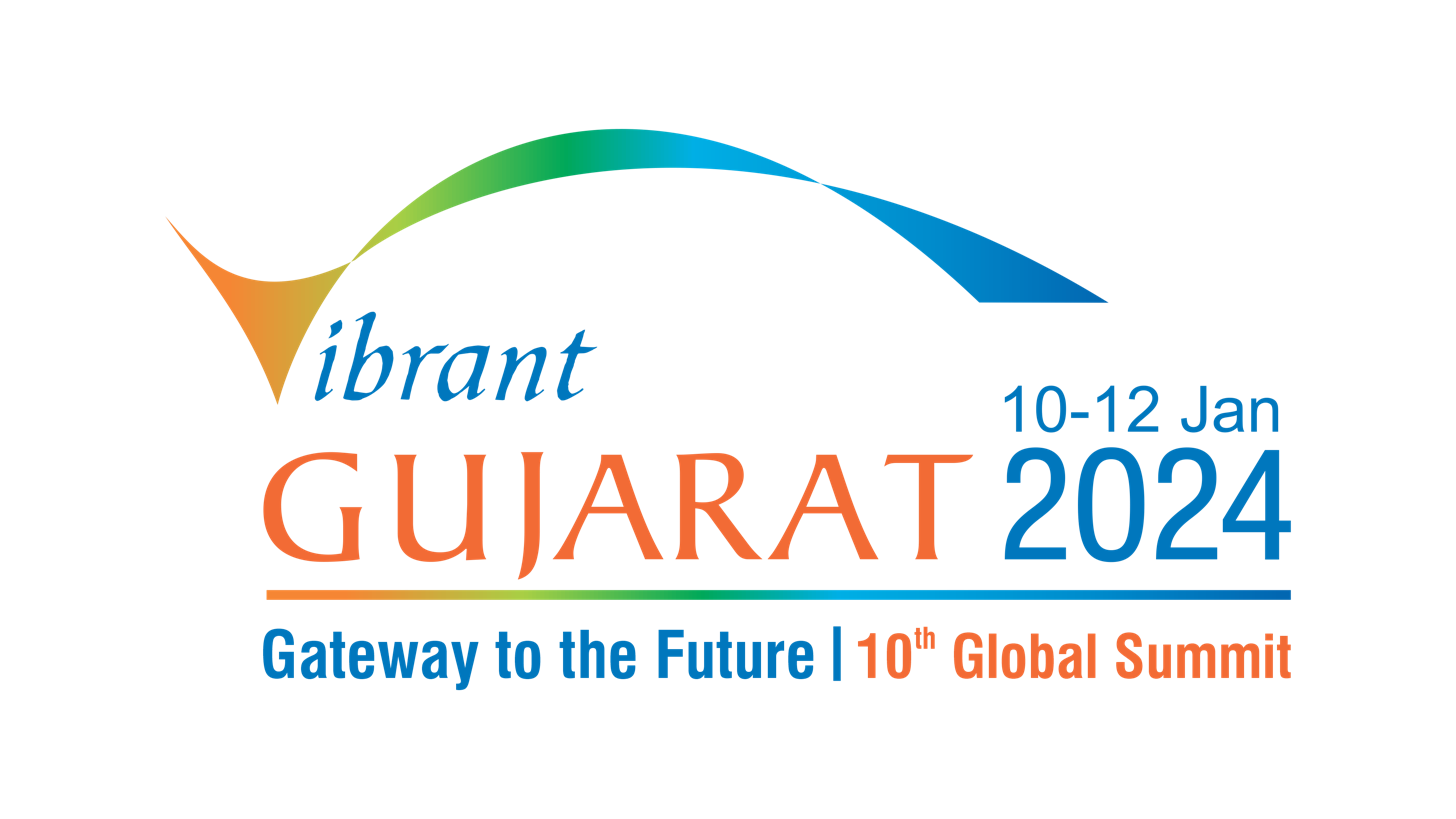

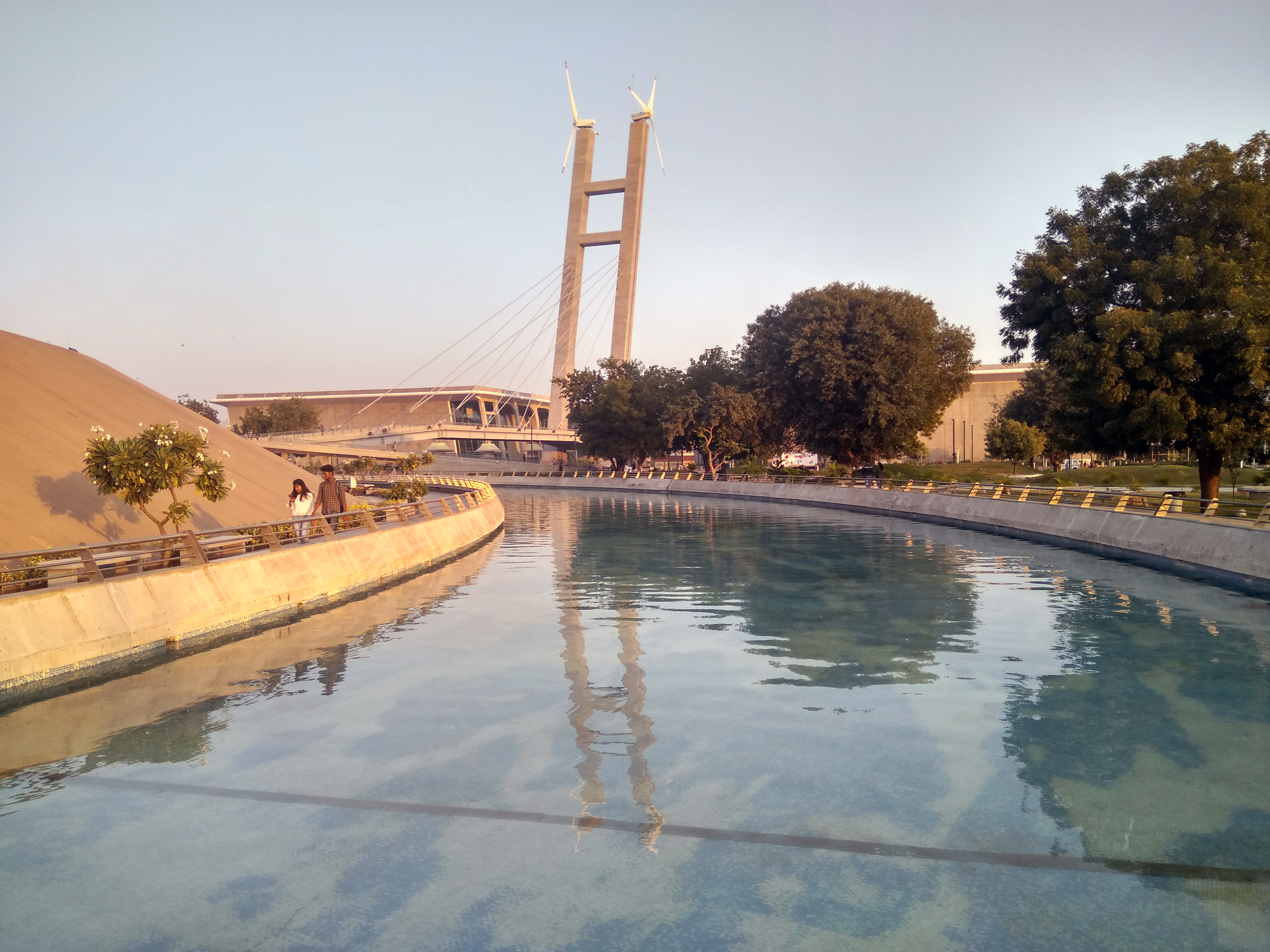
- Mahatma Mandir (Summit Venue)
- Host country: India
- Date: 10–12 January 2024
- Motto: Gateway to the Future
- Cities: Gandhinagar
- Venues: Mahatma Mandir
- Participants: 103,000
- Chair: Bhupendrabhai Patel, Government of Gujarat
- Follows: 2019
- Precedes: 2027
- Website: vibrantgujarat.com

The 10th Vibrant Gujarat Global Summit (VGGS) was held from January 10 to 12, 2024, at Mahatma Mandir Convention and Exhibition Centre in Gandhinagar, Gujarat, India. The summit, organized by the Government of Gujarat in partnership with the Confederation of Indian Industry (CII) and iNDEXTb, focused on the theme "Gateway to the Future," bringing together global leaders, policymakers, and industry experts to discuss and explore opportunities for sustainable development, economic growth, and international cooperation.

The main focus of the Vibrant Gujarat Summit was on semiconductor, green hydrogen, space technology manufacturing, electric mobility, sustainable manufacturing, renewable energy, and Industry 4.0, said CM Bhupendra Patel. The journey of Vibrant Gujarat summit began in 2003 and was held every two years. In preparation for the summit, the Gujarat government conducted roadshows across India and the globe to promote the state's investment potential and attract global investors. These summits were held in major cities such as Mumbai, Delhi, Bangalore, Lucknow, Chennai, Kolkata, and Chandigarh, as well as in international cities like New Jersey, Dubai, Singapore, Tokyo, Frankfurt, Milan, Copenhagen, Paris, Ho Chi Minh City, and Seoul. As of right now, the state government reported that 28 nations and 14 organizations have confirmed to be partners in the summit. MoUs for 41,299 projects, with investment worth ₹26.33 lakh crore were signed during the event.

== Background ==
The Vibrant Gujarat Global Summit, often referred to as the Vibrant Gujarat Summit, is a biennial global business event that is held in the state of Gujarat, India. This biennial summit is known for its significance in fostering economic growth, trade, and investment opportunities in the region. It provides a platform for key stakeholders, including government officials, business leaders, investors, and experts, to come together and discuss various aspects of economic development and collaboration.

The Vibrant Gujarat Global Summit was first launched in 2003, and over the years, it has evolved into one of Gujarat's most important economic forums. It is organized by the Government of Gujarat and supported by various industry associations, both at the national and international levels. The summit's primary objective is to promote Gujarat as an attractive investment destination and to facilitate partnerships and collaborations across different sectors. The primary objective of the summit is to create a platform where business leaders, policymakers, and investors to explore opportunities for investment, collaboration, and partnership in various sectors of the economy. The event is structured to facilitate discussions, negotiations, and agreements in sectors such as energy, manufacturing, infrastructure, information technology, agriculture, healthcare, and more. During the Vibrant Summit series, thousands of MOUs were signed and billions of dollars were spent in Gujarat (2003–76 MOUs worth US$14 billions, 2005–226 MOUs worth US$20 billions, 2007–675 MOUs worth US$152 billions, 2009–8662 MOUs worth US$243 billions, 2011–7936 MOUs worth US$462 billions).

=== 2023 Startup Conclave ===
2023 Startup Conclave
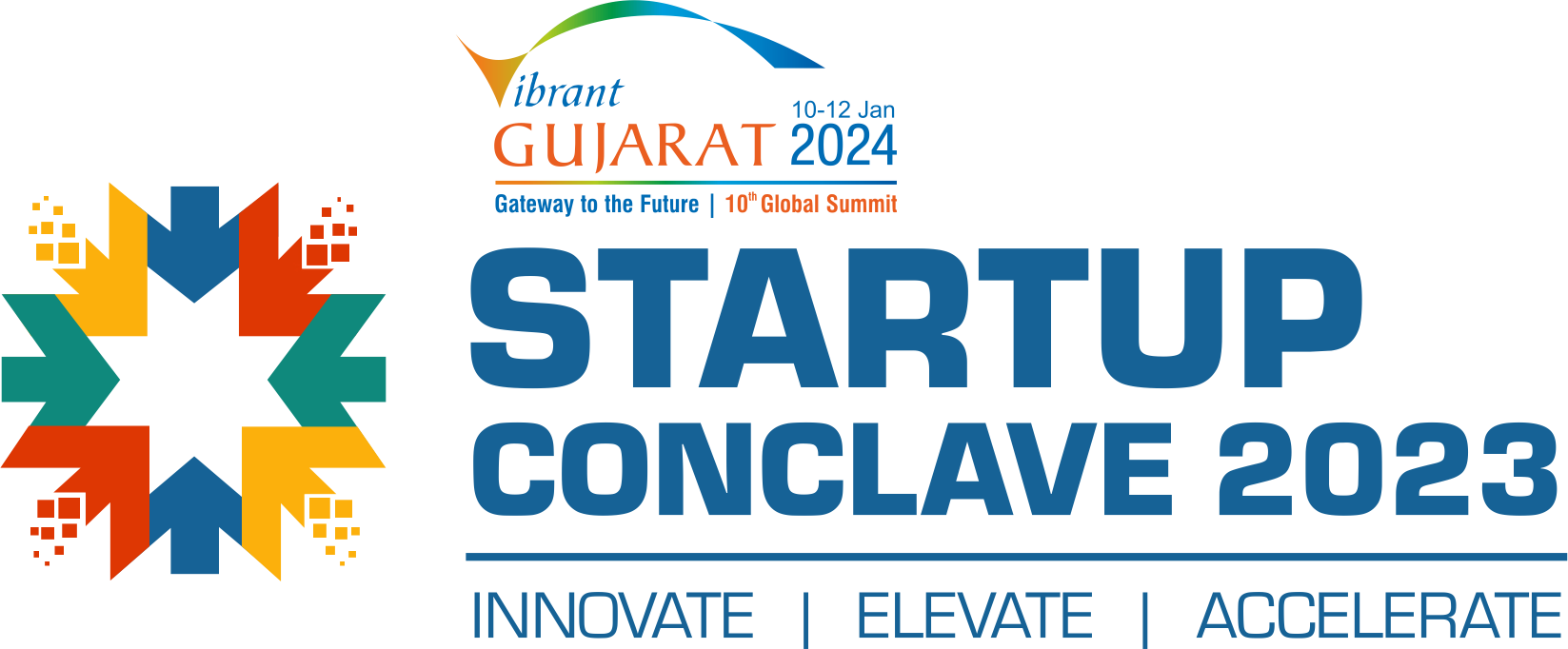
- Host country: India
- Date: 7 December 2023
- Motto: Innovative | Elevate | Accelerate
- Cities: Gandhinagar
- Venues: Helipad Exhibition Centre
- Participants: Rajeev Chandrasekhar
- Website: startupconclave2023.com

The Startup Conclave 2023 was held in Gandhinagar on 7 December 2023 in the build-up to the 2024 Vibrant Gujarat Global Summit. It aimed to highlight India's rapidly evolving startup ecosystem and foster innovation and collaboration within the country. Presently, India is home to over 108 unicorns, with a combined estimated worth of US$340.80 billion. Of these, 44 unicorns with a valuation of roughly US$93 billion were identified in 2021. Gujarat Chief Minister Bhupendra Patel, along with Union Ministers Dharmendra Pradhan and Rajeev Chandrasekhar, attended the roundtable as well.

It was organized by the state education department in collaboration with the Department of promotion of industry and internal trade (DPIIT), with the Federation of Indian Chambers of Commerce and Industry (FICCI) serving as the knowledge partner, according to state government sources. The event was attended by established startup founders, investors, venture capitalists, industry experts, and innovators.

Representatives from unicorn startups, venture capitalists from around the country, and state businesspeople attended the summit, according to the minister. Additionally, Rajeev Chandrasekhar, Minister of State for Skill Development, Entrepreneurship, Electronics, and Information Technology, and Union Education Minister Dharmendra Pradhan also attended a roundtable meeting on December 6 in Gandhinagar. Rushikesh Patel stated, "To provide a more flexible and conducive environment for startups, the roundtable meeting and startup conclave aimed to focus on regulatory reforms, tax incentives, and enhancing the startup ecosystem in terms of compliance." A study of Gujarat's and India's private equity and venture capital investment landscapes will also be covered in the conversation.

== VGVD ==
Vibrant Gujarat-Vibrant District (VGVD) is an initiative undertaken by the Government of Gujarat to promote economic development and investment across all 33 districts of the state. The program was launched in 2023 as a precursor to the 10th edition of the Vibrant Gujarat Global Summit (VGGS), scheduled for January 2024. One of the key aspects of the VGVD program is the promotion of the "One District-One Product" (ODOP) initiative. This initiative aims to identify and nurture a flagship product or industry in each district, leveraging its unique strengths and competitive advantages to boost local economies. ODOP products range from traditional handicrafts to innovative technologies, reflecting the diverse economic landscape of Gujarat. These exhibitions highlighted items from the 'One District-One Product' (ODOP) project, increasing their visibility. Startups, local MSMEs, self-help organizations, FPOs, women entrepreneurs, khadi and village industries, cottage industries, and PM Vishwakarma Yojana beneficiaries all took part. Under the Credit Linkage Program, loan fairs were held during the events, and recipients received checks for approved loans. As part of the 'Vocal for Local' campaign, 996 stalls were put up in the exhibitions to promote and spread local goods. The Vibrant Gujarat-Vibrant District initiative organized seminars and workshops on a range of subjects, as well as B2B, B2C, and B2G interactions with traders and businessmen.

The Vibrant Gujarat-Vibrant District (VGVD) program took place in all 32 districts of Gujarat from October 2 to October 31, 2023, falling between Gandhi Jayanti and Sardar Patel Jayanti. This was done in preparation for the Vibrant Gujarat Global Summit in 2024. In all, 2,614 Memorandum of Understandings (MoUs) showing prospective investments above Rs 45,000 crores were inked, according to the official announcement from the state government.

== MoUs ==
- Pre-Summit MoUs: Gujarat had signed MoUs for proposed investments totaling ₹7,12,250 crores. These agreements estimated the creation of 3,70,165 direct and indirect employment opportunities.
- Summit MoUs: During the 10th edition of the Vibrant Summit, Gujarat signed the total investment commitment to more than ₹45 lakh crore across 98,540 projects.

KP Group and the Government of Gujarat signed an MoU to install 2.6+ GW of Solar, Wind & Hybrid power plants, as well as a green hydrogen plant in Gujarat. The estimated investment of 17,690 crore rupees and the creation of an estimated 13,750 jobs in Gujarat are anticipated by the year 2026.

== Participants ==
About 1.3 lakh participants from 140 countries have registered for the 10th edition of Vibrant Gujarat Global Summit. 200 Russian government representatives and entrepreneurs will take part in Vibrant Gujarat.

=== Participating leaders ===
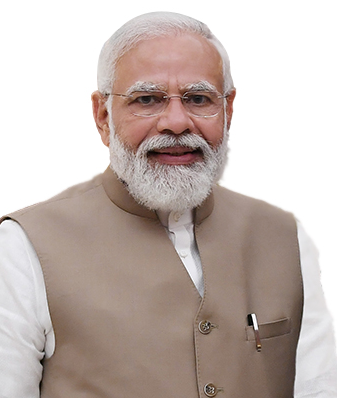
India Narendra Modi, Prime Minister of India

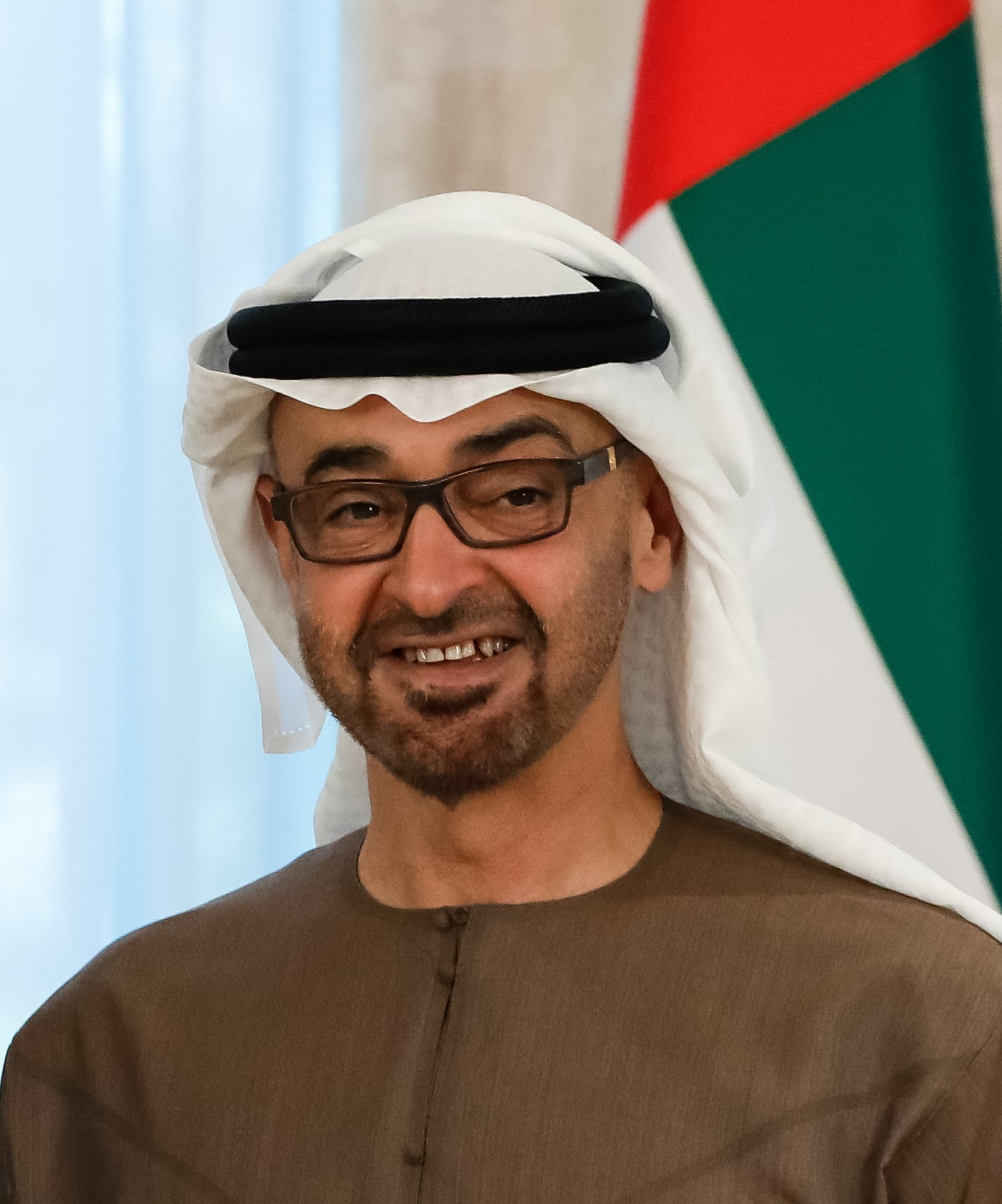
United Arab Emirates Mohamed bin Zayed Al Nahyan, President of the United Arab Emirates

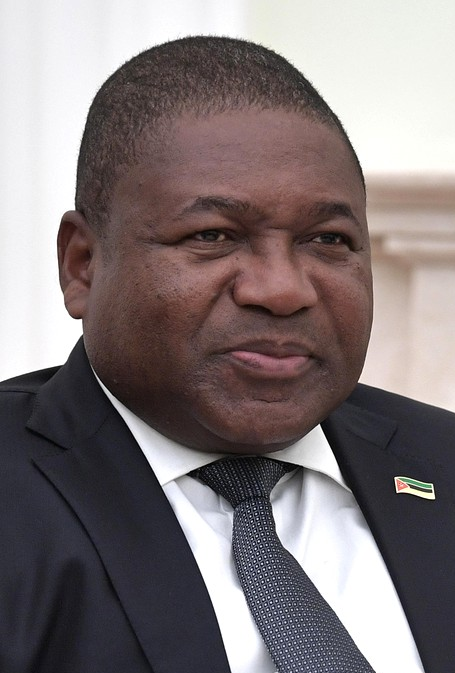
Mozambique Filipe Nyusi, President of Mozambique

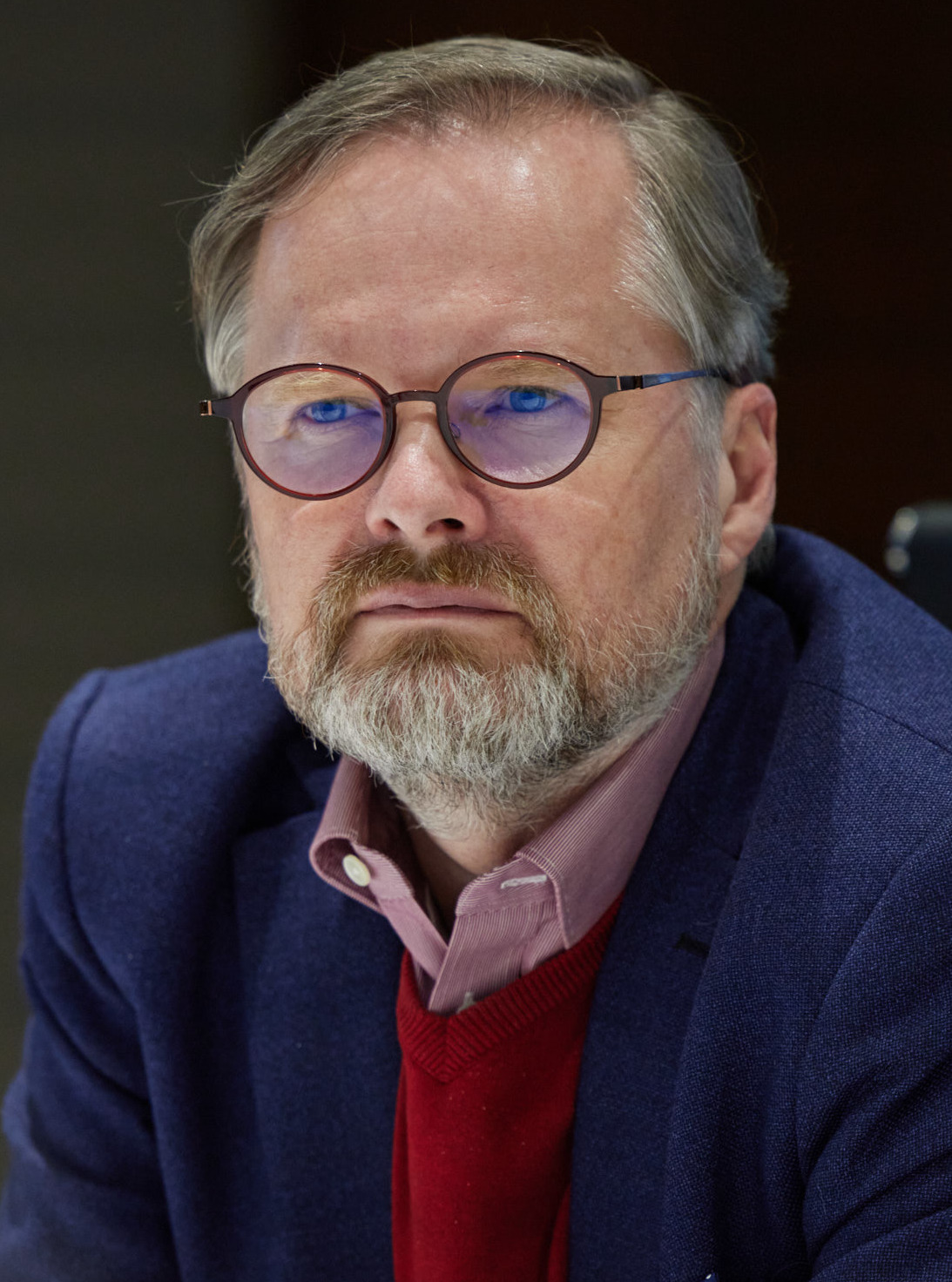
Czech Republic Petr Fiala, Prime Minister of the Czech Republic

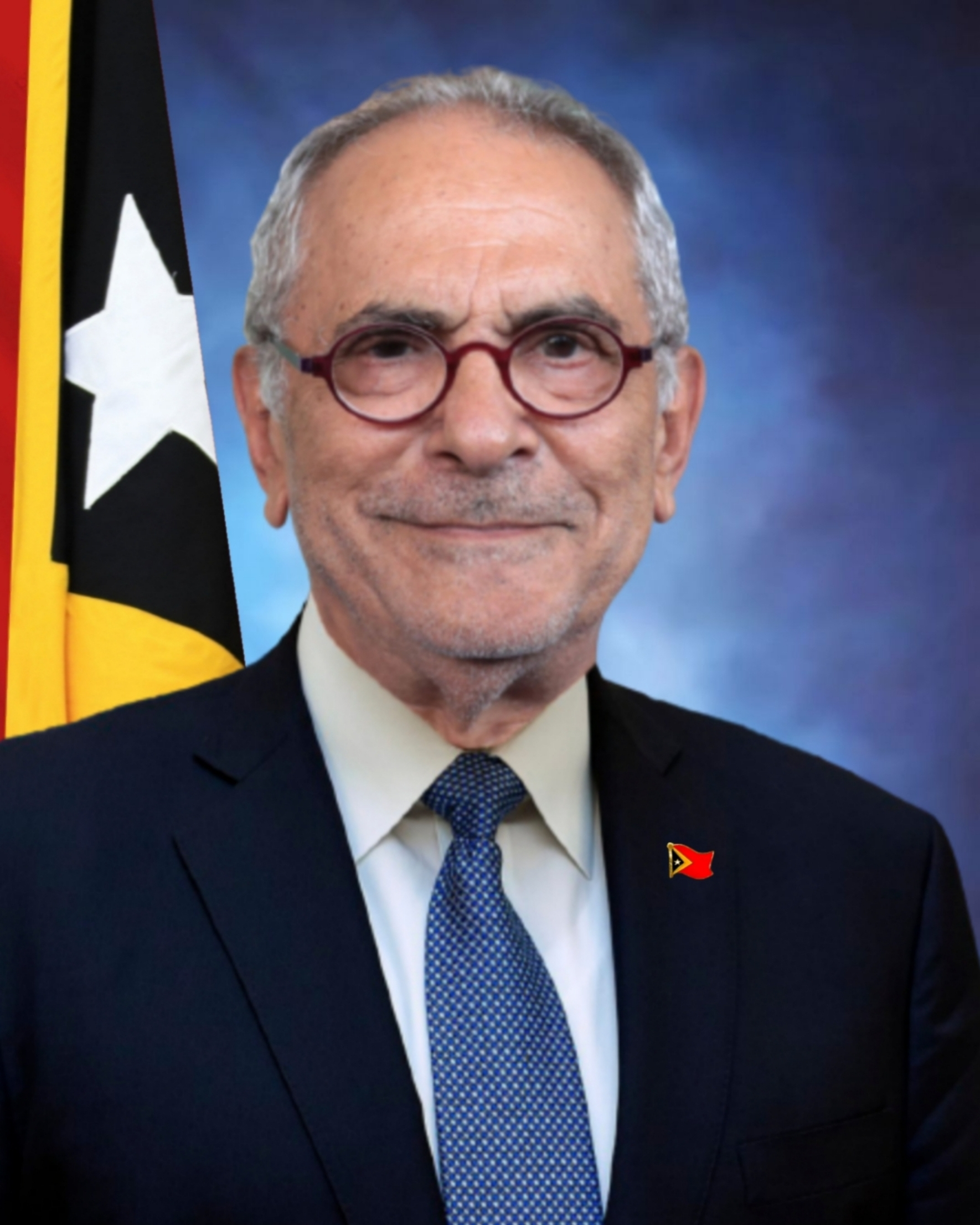
East Timor José Ramos-Horta, President of East Timor

== Speakers ==
- Vumlunmang Vualnam, the Secretary of the Ministry of Civil Aviation for the Government of India
- Kanika Tekriwal, the Founder & CEO of JetsetGo
- Venkat Katkuri, Head of Airbus Defense and Space (India and South Asia)
- K. Rajaraman, IAS, Chairman International Financial Services Centres Authority

== See also ==
- Economy of Gujarat
