= Bosnia and Herzegovina–India relations =

- Bosnia and Herzegovina: India

Bosnia and Herzegovina–India relations are the bilateral ties between India and Bosnia and Herzegovina. India's Budapest office is concurrently accredited to Sarajevo as resident mission/embassy, while Bosnia and Herzegovina has its office in New Delhi.

== History ==
India and Bosnia and Herzegovina relations developed initially during the years when Bosnia and Herzegovina were part of Yugoslavia, when Jawaharlal Nehru formed a relationship with Josip Broz Tito.

== Economic relations ==
Trade between Bosnia and India is in the range of US$50 million. Trade is limited by finance/credit availability and inadequate banking links. Bosnia's main port is the Croatian Port of Ploce, complicating logistics. In 2006, a session was organized related to Joint Trade and Economic Cooperation between Bosnia and Herzegovina and India. Investments were sought in Bosnia and Herzegovina, focusing textiles, auto parts, infrastructure projects and pharmaceutical sectors.

== Cultural relations ==
An exhibition named ‘Meanwhile in India’ opened in Sarajevo, in March 2015 presenting landscapes and images of the everyday life in India.

The Indo-Bosnia Cultural Forum was formed by H.E.Sabit Subasic Ambassador of Bosnia And Herzegovina to India during 6th Global Festival of Journalism 2018 to develop and promote relations between two countries. The Bosnia India Friendship Society in Sarajevo works to promote cultural ties between the two countries under the leadership of Dunja Mašić.

== Energy cooperation ==
The minister of foreign trade from Bosnia and Herzegovina, discussed a study based on India's renewable energy model and its implementations in Bosnia which would explore opportunities for both sides.

== See also ==
- Foreign relations of Bosnia and Herzegovina
- Foreign relations of India
- India–Yugoslavia relations
- Yugoslavia and the Non-Aligned Movement
