= Gujarat Science City =

Science centre located in Gujarat, India

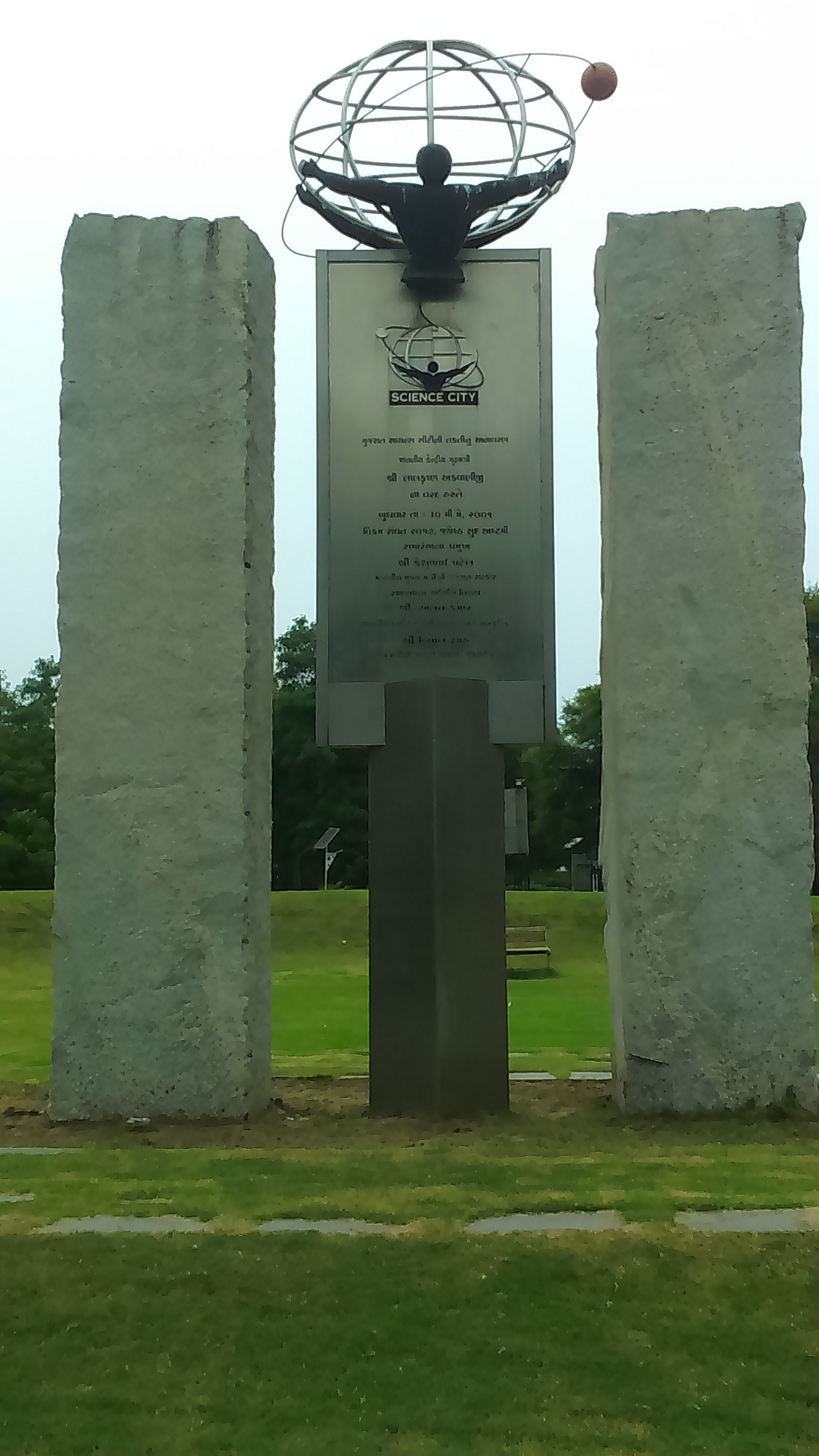
- Gujarat Science City
- Click on the map and then on icons for details Interactive map of Gujarat Science City
- Location: Ahmedabad, Gujarat, India
- Coordinates: 23°4′48″N 72°29′46″E
- Status: Operating
- Opened: May 2001
- Owner: Gujarat Council of Science City
- Theme: Science education and entertainment
- Operating season: Year-round
- Area: 107 ha (260 acres)
- Website: Official website

Gujarat Science City is a science education and entertainment centre located in Ahmedabad, Gujarat, India. Opened in 2002 and expanded in 2021, it has an IMAX 3D theatre; exhibitions on science, space, energy park, life science park, planet earth, hall of science, musical fountain, thrill ride, plants, nature and robotics; an aquarium, an aviary and a butterfly park; as well as other facilities.

== History ==
In 1999, the Gujarat Council of Science City, an autonomous registered society was established under the Department of Science and Technology, Government of Gujarat.

Under Phase-I of the development, the IMAX 3D theatre, the first of its kind in India, was opened in 2002. It was followed by the construction of various exhibitions such as Hall of Science, Hall of Space, Energy Education Park, Life Science Park, Planet Earth as well as facilities such as children's activity center, thrill rides, amphitheatre and musical fountain.

In 2021, under Phase-II development, an aquatic gallery, a robotics gallery, and a nature park were constructed at a cost of ₹264 crore (US$28 million), ₹127 crore (US$13 million) and ₹14 crore (US$1.5 million) respectively. They were inaugurated on 16 July 2021 by Prime Minister Narendra Modi.

== Features ==
=== Entertainment facilities ===
Entertainment facilities at the Science City include IMAX 3D theatre, 30-seat thrill ride, giant LED screen for displaying films, dancing musical fountains and 1200-seat capacity amphitheatre.

=== Planet Earth ===
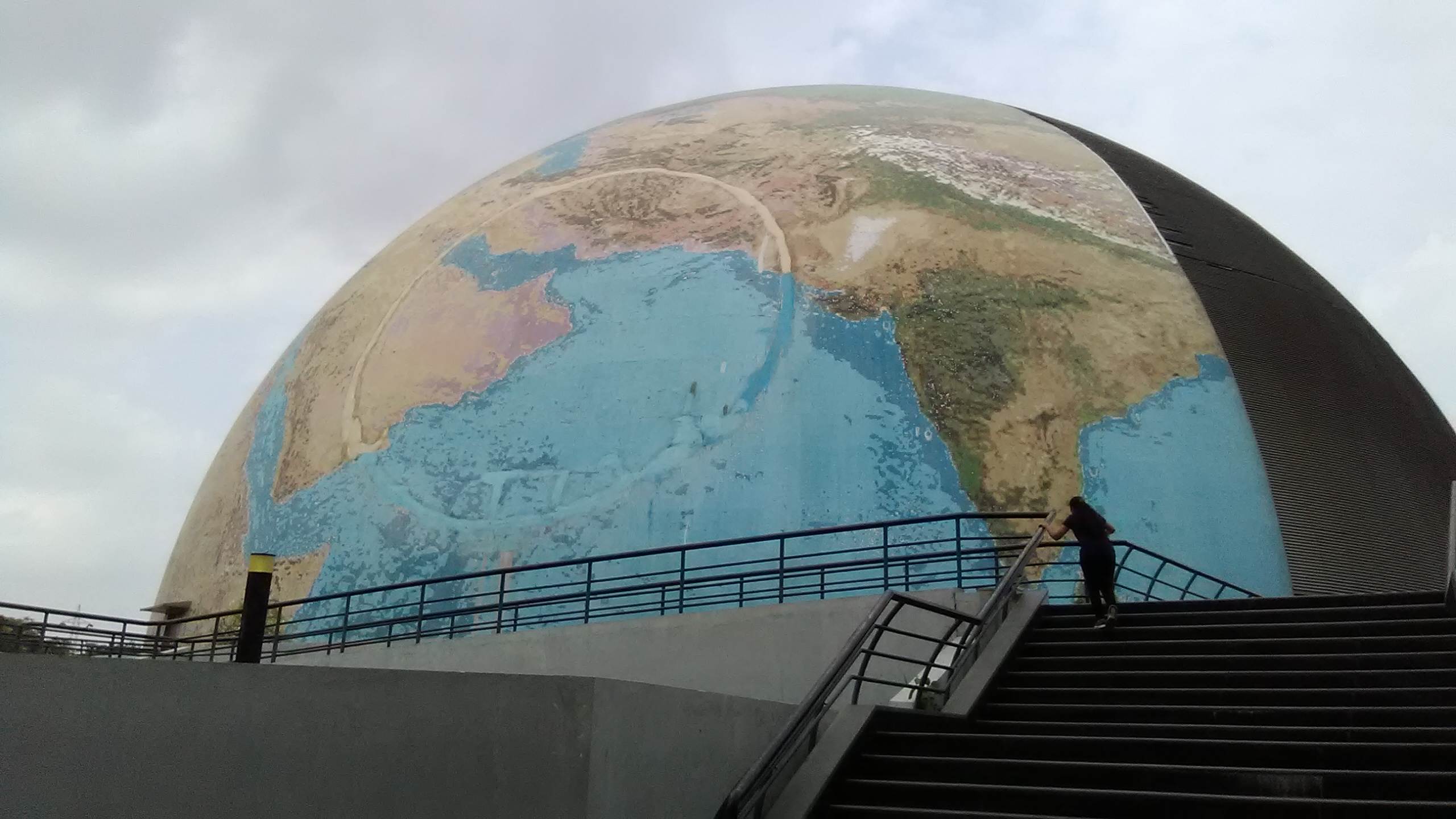
Dome of the Planet Earth pavilion

The Planet Earth pavilion is spread over an area of 9,000 square metres (97,000 sq ft). It has an earth-shaped dome with diameter of 50 metres (160 ft), one of the largest in the country, built in 2009. It has exhibits and rides about natural disasters, disaster management, planetarium, natural resources and its conservation. It has more than 650 exhibits.

=== Hall of Space and Science ===
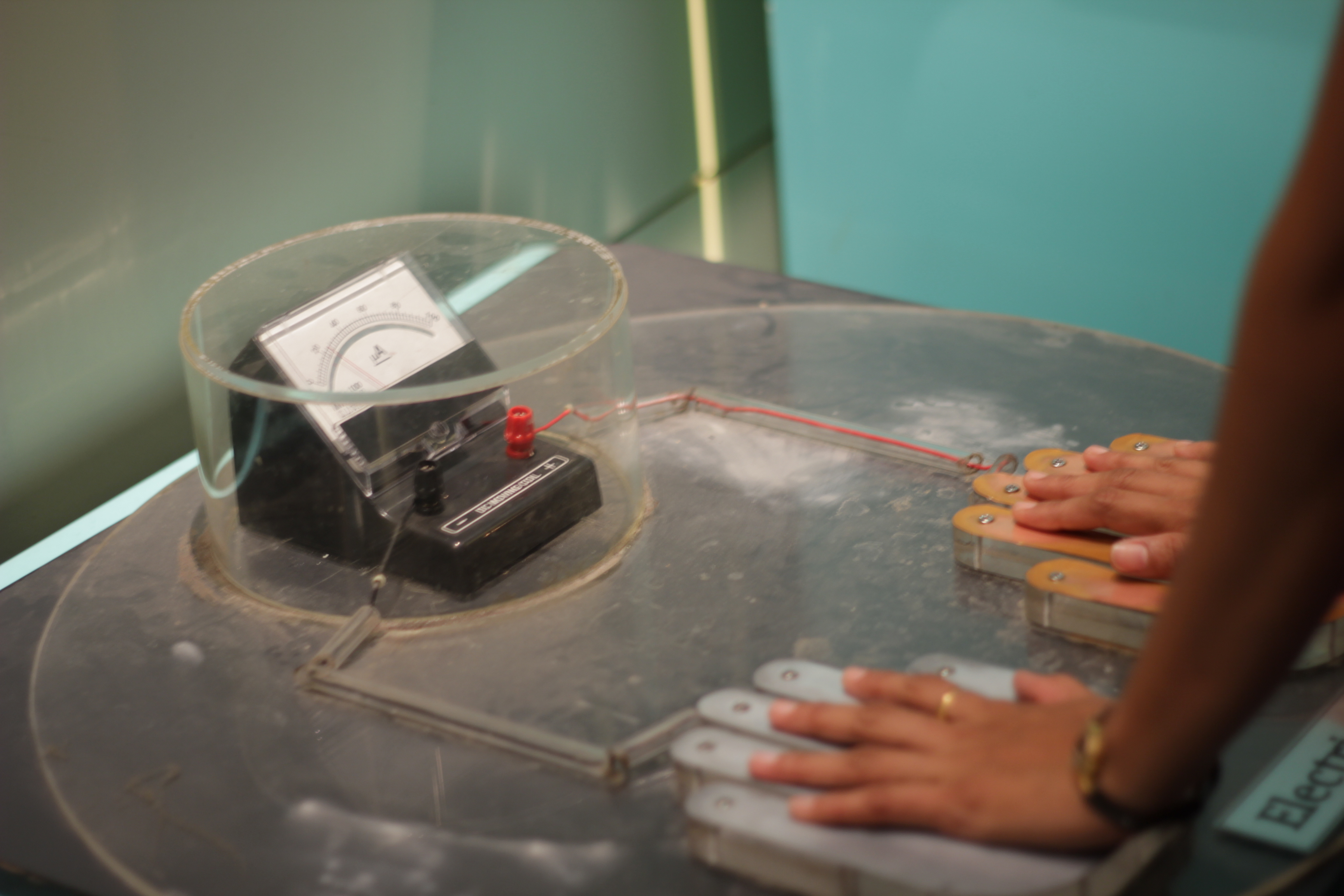
Science experiment in Hall of Electricity in Hall of Science

The hall of space has an exhibition on solar system, universe, space technology and history of space exploration. The hall of science has exhibits on light, sound, mathematics, kinematics, vision, mirrors, energy and fluids.

=== Energy Education Park ===
The park holds exhibits on solar energy, wind power, hydroelectricity, tidal power, geothermal energy, petroleum and petrochemicals. It has models of Sardar Sarovar dam and petroleum rigs.

=== Life Science Park ===
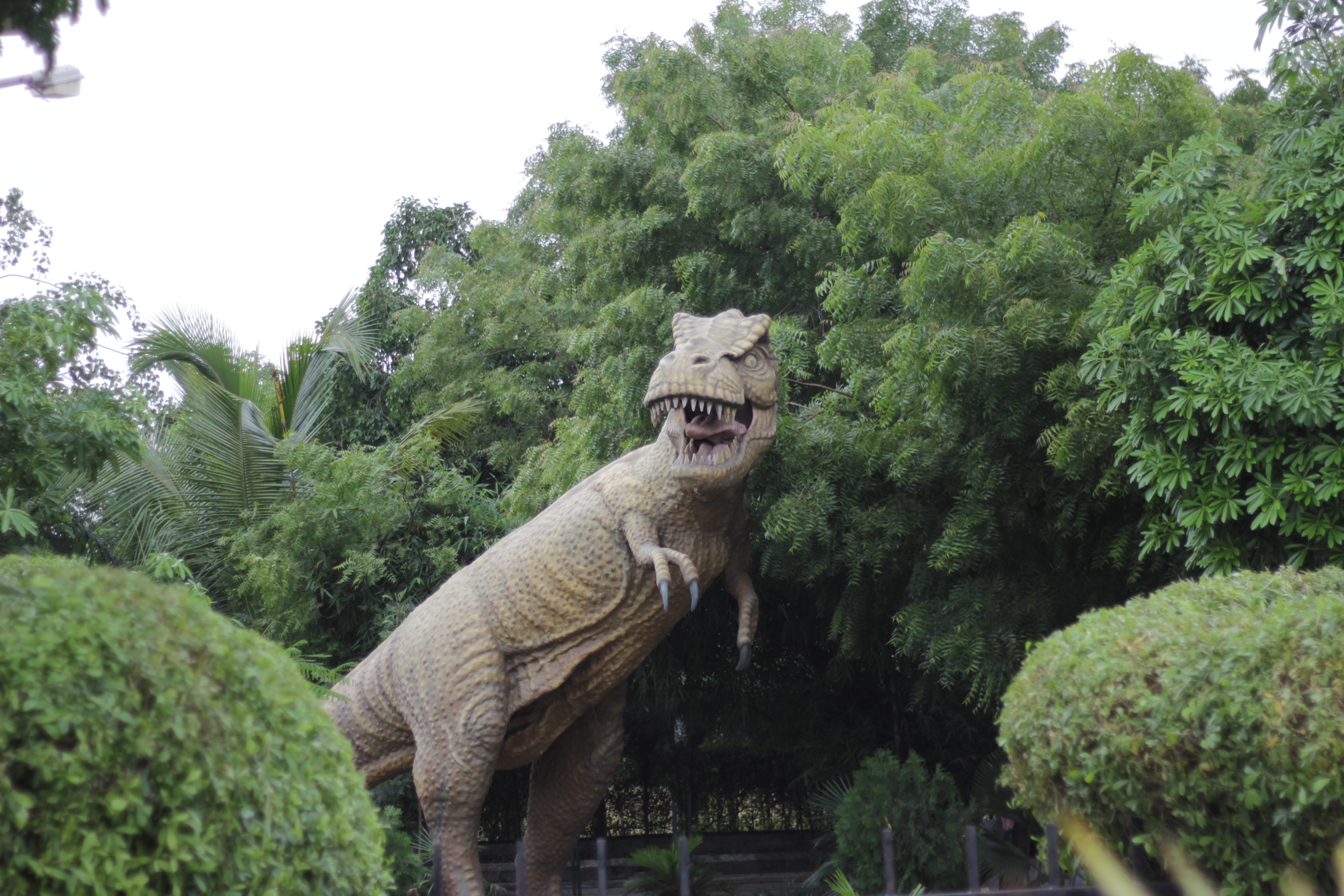
Dinosaur model at Life Science Park

The park spread over an area of 9000 sqm is dedicated to life sciences. It has exhibits on river system and evolution. It also has outdoor exhibition on aromatic, medicinal and economic plants as well as ornamental plants. There is a Cactus, Succulent and Bonsai Corner; Butterfly House; aviary and tissue culture lab.

=== Aquatic gallery ===
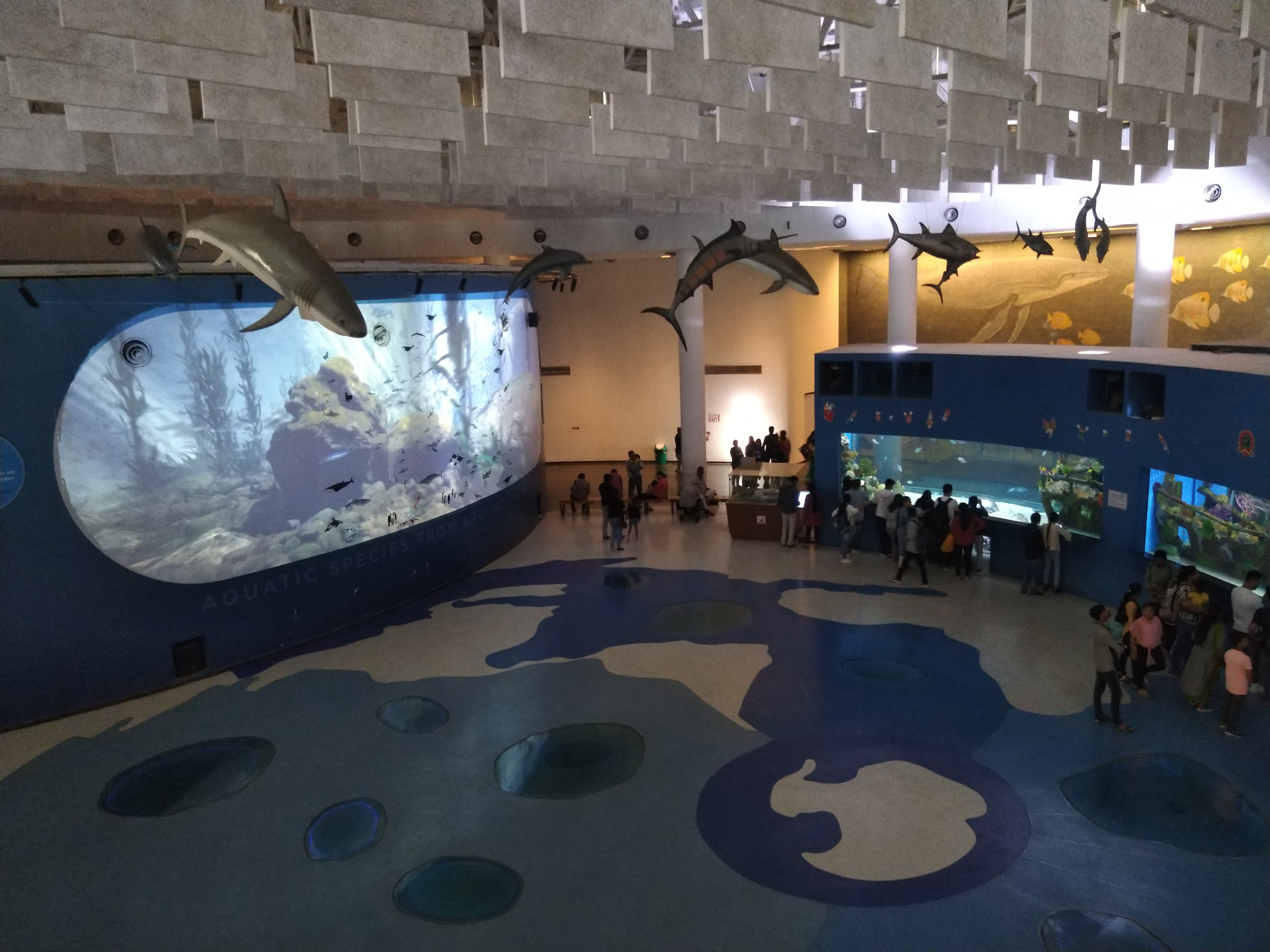
Aquatic gallery

The aquatic gallery is spread over an area of 15,000 square metres (160,000 sq ft). It has 68 tanks which hold brackish, marine and fresh waters in variety of ecosystems marked as Indian, Asian, African and American Zones. It has 11,690 animals from 188 species. The shark tunnel in the gallery is 28 metres (92 ft) long.

=== Robotics gallery ===
The three floor robotics gallery has 79 types of robots on display. The ground floor has an interactive exhibition and a cafeteria. It also has an exhibit displaying evolution of robotics. There is a robot dance gallery, and virtual and augmented reality gallery as well.

=== Nature Park ===
The nature park is spread over an area of 8 acres (3.2 ha) and educates about botany and biology.

=== Amphitheater ===
Amphitheater (Open Air Theater) at Gujarat Science City with a capacity of 1200 seats hosts Science related especially Science Popularization activities.

== Activities ==
Apart from science education and entertainment, the center also provides housing for students preparing for science exams.

== Gallery ==
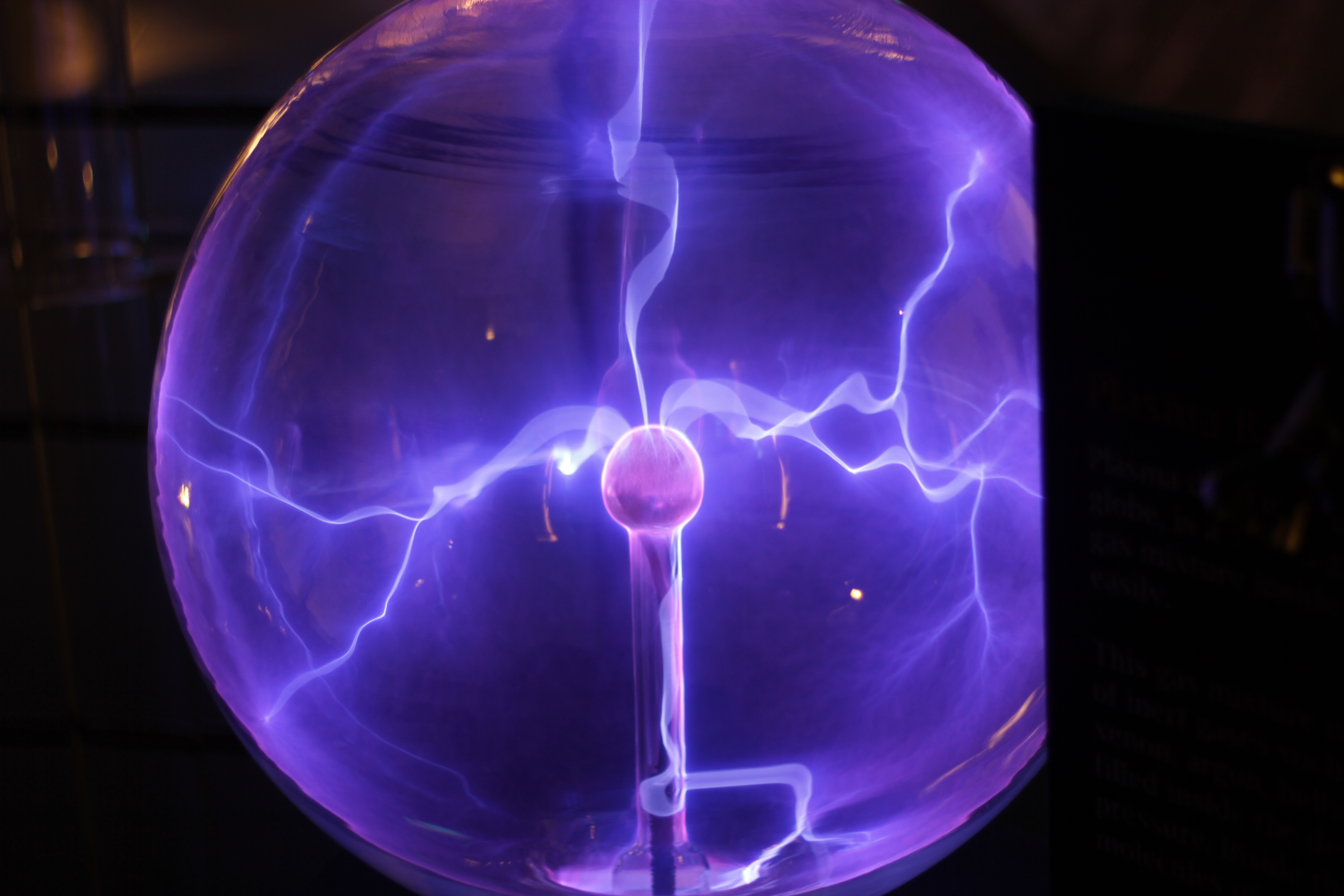
Electrodom Room

== See also ==
- Science Centre, Surat
- Swami Vivekananda Planetarium, Mangalore
