= India's reaction to the 2008 Kosovo declaration of independence =

Foreign reaction to the Kosovo declaration of independence

Kosovo's declaration of independence from Serbia was enacted on Sunday, 17 February 2008 by a unanimous vote of the Assembly of Kosovo. All 11 representatives of the Serb minority boycotted the proceedings. International reaction was mixed, and the world community continues to be divided on the issue of the international recognition of Kosovo. India's reaction to the 2008 Kosovo declaration of independence is one of non-recognition.

== Reaction ==
On 18 February 2008, in response to questions on developments regarding Kosovo, an official spokesperson of the Indian Ministry of Foreign Affairs said, "It has been India's consistent position that the sovereignty and territorial integrity of all countries should be fully respected by all states. We have believed that the Kosovo issue should have been resolved through peaceful means and through consultation and dialogue between the concerned parties. We have taken note of the Unilateral Declaration of Independence by Kosovo. There are several legal issues involved in this Declaration. We are studying the evolving situation". In March 2008, the Indian ambassador to Serbia, Ajay Swarup, told a Serbian newspaper, "India's position on Kosovo has been and still is consistent, and that is that the sovereignty and territorial integrity of every country must be fully respected by all other countries". Swarup added that a "high level of India's support to Serbia" can be seen from the comments and articles which appeared in the Indian press following Kosovo's declaration. Swarup also pointed out that Kosovo "can set a very dangerous precedent for similar cases around the world". On 15 May 2008, the Foreign Ministers of India, Russia and the People's Republic of China made a joint statement regarding Kosovo during a conference in Yekaterinburg. It was read by the host minister, Sergey Lavrov of Russia, and it said "In our statement, we recorded our fundamental position that the unilateral declaration of independence by Kosovo contradicts Resolution 1244. Russia, India and China encourage Belgrade and Pristina to resume talks within the framework of international law and hope they reach an agreement on all problems of that Serbian territory". On 31 July 2008, Swarup stated that "India abides by the principles of international law and does not recognize Kosovo's secession".

In January 2009, Swarup stated that "India will support Serbia on the issue of protection of her sovereignty in all international forums".

According to leaked US embassy cables, then U.S. Ambassador to India David C. Mulford pressured India in joining with the United States and other European countries in recognizing Kosovo's independence as early as possible after its expected declaration in 2008. But due to India's historical alignment with Russia and fear that Kosovo independence will set a precedent for Kashmir independence made non-recognition of Kosovo's independence as India's default position.

In September 2021, the president of Kosovo, Vjosa Osmani, once again urged the Indian government to recognize the "Sovereign territory of Kosovo".

In November 2022, spokesperson of the Ministry of External Affarirs of India Arindam Bagchi stated that India's position on Kosovo has not changed, in response to reports on the opening of the India-Kosovo Commercial Economic Office in New Delhi.

== See also ==
- India–Kosovo relations
- International recognition of Kosovo
