= India–Yugoslavia relations =

- India: Yugoslavia

India–Yugoslavia relations were historical foreign relations between India and now split-up Socialist Federal Republic of Yugoslavia. Yugoslavia established full diplomatic relations with India on 5 December 1948 following the 1948 Tito–Stalin split. Initially two countries developed their relations at the UN Security Council in 1949 during their shared membership. In the period of the Cold War both countries were the founders and among core members of the Non-Aligned Movement.

== History ==
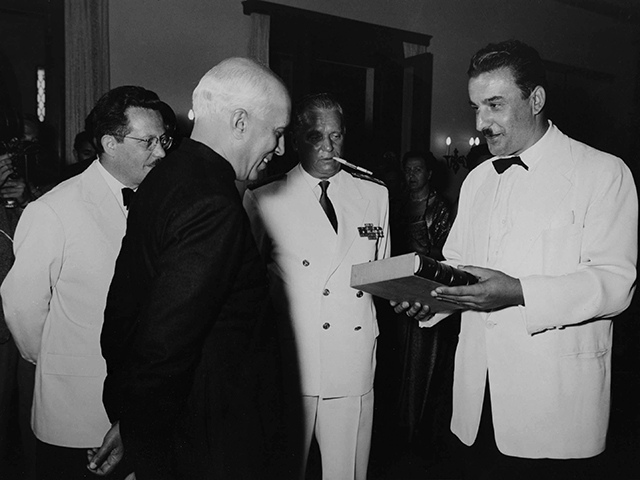
Jawaharlal Nehru in Yugoslavia.

In the immediate period following the establishment of the bilateral relations the Embassy of Yugoslavia in London was responsible for Yugoslav relations with India, while the Embassy of India in Rome was responsible for Indian relations with Yugoslavia. The Embassy of Yugoslavia in India (New Delhi) and the Consulate in Bombay were established as early as 1950. In late 1954 and early 1955 President of Yugoslavia Josip Broz Tito visited India for the first time. Tito was the first European leader who visited India after the independence of the country. Indian Prime Minister Jawaharlal Nehru returned the visit in late June and early July 1955.

At the 1956 Brioni Meeting President of Yugoslavia Tito, Indian Prime Minister Nehru and President of Egypt Gamal Abdel Nasser met on Brijuni islands in the Yugoslav constituent Socialist Republic of Croatia where they initiated the process which will lead to the establishment of the Non-Aligned Movement in 1961 at the Belgrade Conference. In 1956 India and Yugoslavia signed the trade agreement in New Delhi.

Following period was marked by the exchange of frequent meetings and intensive personal correspondence between Yugoslav and Indian leadership. The new Indian Prime Minister Indira Gandhi visited Yugoslavia for the first time as a prime minister in 1966 which was followed by the return meeting of Tito in the same year. Already in 1967 Indira Gandhi visited Yugoslavia once again, and the return visit was organized in 1968. Tito and Indira Gandhi expressed identical attitudes regarding institutionalization of cooperation within the Non-Aligned Movement. During the meeting in India in October 1971 Tito and Indira Gandhi both expressed concern over the treatment of Sheikh Mujibur Rahman who was arrested at the time. President Tito was awarded the Jawaharlal Nehru Award for International Understanding during his visit to New Delhi in January 1974.

== See also ==
- Foreign relations of India
- Foreign relations of Yugoslavia
- India and the Non-Aligned Movement
- Yugoslavia and the Non-Aligned Movement
- Bosnia and Herzegovina–India relations
- Croatia–India relations
- India–Montenegro relations
- India–North Macedonia relations
- India–Serbia relations
- India–Slovenia relations
