= Mahatma Mandir =

Convention centre and a memorial located at Gandhinagar, Gujarat, India

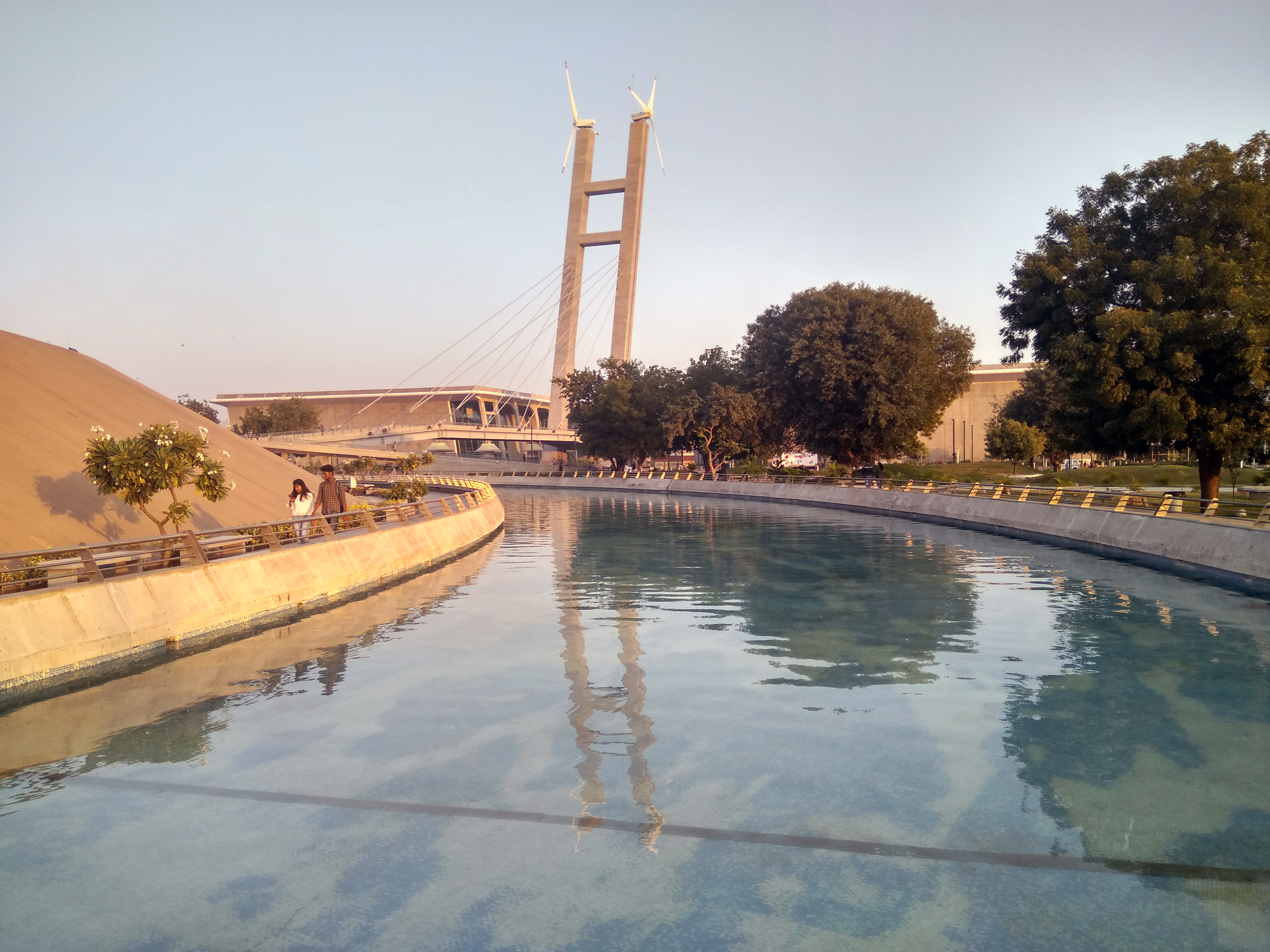
- Mahatma Mandir in 2019
- Interactive map of Mahatma Mandir
- Address: Sector 13
- Location: Gandhinagar, Gujarat, India
- Coordinates: 23°13′50″N 72°38′3″E
- Owner: Government of Gujarat

Construction
- Built: 1 May 2010 - 2013
- Cost: ₹215 crore (US$23 million)

Website
- www.theleela.com/en_us/gujarat/mahatma-mandir-convention-and-exhibition-centre/

Mahatma Mandir is a convention and exhibition centre located at sector 13 C in Gandhinagar, Gujarat, India. It is inspired by the life and philosophy of Mahatma Gandhi. It is one of the biggest convention centres in India, spread over an area of 34 acres (14 ha; 0.053 sq mi). It was developed by the Government of Gujarat. Business summits like Vibrant Gujarat Global Investor Summit 2011, 2013, 2015, 2017 and 2019 were organised here.

== History ==
The Government of Gujarat wanted to develop Mahatma Mandir as a place of unity and development. Sand was brought in urns by representatives of all 18,066 villages of Gujarat and emptied in the foundation of the Mahatma Mandir. A time capsule was buried under Mahatma Mandir containing a history of state in 2010 at the groundbreaking ceremony.

It was built by Larsen & Toubro (L&T) and Shapoorji Pallonji and Company Limited in two phases. The planning and design of the building is environment-friendly.

Phase 1 of Mahatma Mandir was constructed in nine months starting from May 2010 to January 2011 at cost of ₹135 crore (US$14 million). It includes a convention centre, three large exhibition halls and some small halls with conference facilities.

Phase 2 included the construction of a salt mound memorial, a garden, a suspension bridge, windmills and development of parking space at cost of ₹80 crore (US$8.4 million). 356 families of slum dwellers were displaced by the project which resulted in controversy. They were later provided new accommodation. Some Gandhians protested against the project arguing that it did not reflect the philosophy of Mahatma Gandhi.

== Structures ==
=== Convention centre ===
The convention centre has column free air conditioned halls with a capacity to accommodate over 15,000 people at a time. Its theatre style main hall has capacity for 6000 people. Exhibition halls are built over an area of 10,000 sq ft (930 m^{2}). It has four seminar halls (three having seating capacity of 500 and one with capacity of 1000), seven high tech conference halls and a meeting room. The Mahatma Mandir Convention and Exhibition Centre by The Leela draws inspiration from the life and philosophy of Mahatma Gandhi. Spread across 34 acres, it is one of the biggest state-of-art facility in India, uniquely designed to combine a sense of aesthetics, functionality and flexibility. The 20,000 sq.m. of convention and exhibition area makes of natural light and airy spaces. It is equipped with energy efficient lighting and waste water management. The Leela Gandhinagar which is expected to be completed by early 2019 will be a 300-room 5 star hotel built inside the complex.

=== Memorial ===
A memorial dedicated to Mahatma Gandhi was constructed by Shapoorji Pallonji and Company Limited. A suspension bridge is built in memory of the Dandi March. A concrete dome structure is constructed representing salt mound houses a museum, library and research center. A sculpture garden with stone murals depicting the life of Mahatma Gandhi is also developed. A grand spinning wheel, Charkha, is installed also.

=== Central vista ===
A 162-metre-wide (531 ft) and 3-kilometre-long (1.9 mi) road connecting the Mahatma Mandir and the Gujarat Legislative Assembly building was constructed. It has three lanes on both side with gardens between them. It is the broadest avenue in Gujarat.
