= India–Serbia relations =

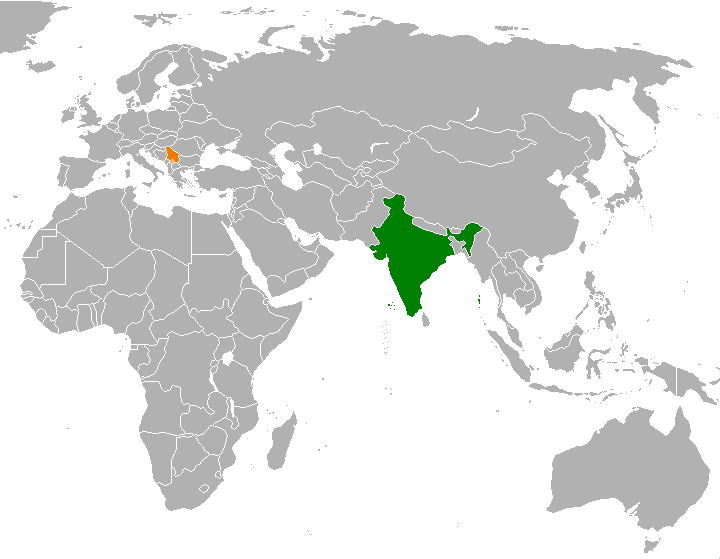
- India: Serbia

Diplomatic mission
- Embassy of India, Belgrade: Embassy of Serbia, New Delhi

India and Serbia maintain diplomatic relations established between India and SFR Yugoslavia in 1948. From 1948 to 2006, India maintained relations with the Socialist Federal Republic of Yugoslavia (SFRY) and the Federal Republic of Yugoslavia (FRY) (later Serbia and Montenegro), of which Serbia is considered shared (SFRY) or sole (FRY) legal successor.

== History ==
During 1300-1400 CE, Romani people of Indian origin had already settled in Serbia.

In 1926, Rabindranath Tagore gave two lectures at the University of Belgrade. Both countries were founding members of the Non Aligned Movement with Serbia being part of Socialist Federal Republic of Yugoslavia at the time. The countries had developed close and friendly relations during the period of Cold War when both Yugoslavia and India tried to maintain peaceful coexistence among nations. Especially close relations existed between the Yugoslav president Josip Broz Tito and India's first Prime Minister, Pandit Jawaharlal Nehru. Since 1970s, New Belgrade has two streets named after Mahatma Gandhi and Jawaharlal Nehru, with the busts of the two leaders set in that place in 1990s. India was one of the nations that co-sponsored the proposal to readmit the Federal Republic of Yugoslavia (Serbia and Montenegro) to the United Nations in 2000. During her visit to Belgrade in 2013, Indian Foreign Minister Preneet Kaur stated that she hopes that Serbia will continue to support reforms in international bodies, including the United Nations, and India's bid to become a permanent member of the UN Security Council. In a 2018 interview for local media, Indian Ambassador to Serbia, Narinder Chauhan, stated that "Despite the breakup of Yugoslavia our political relations continue to be exceptional, marked by a long tradition of mutual support on issues of core interest... It is a matter of immense satisfaction that Serbia also supports India’s international role. India sees Serbia as a reliable partner."

== India's stance on Kosovo ==
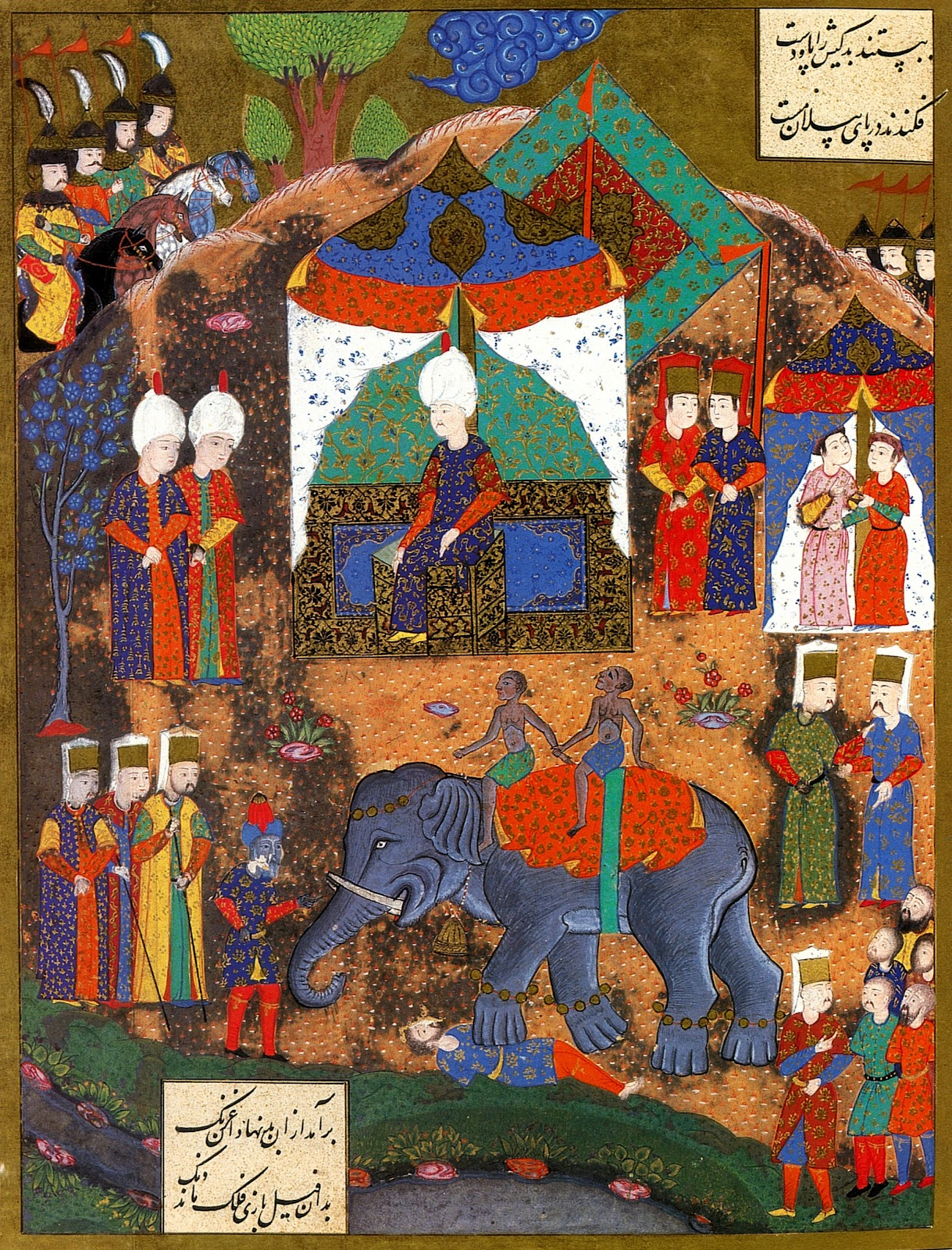
16th-century Ottoman miniature depicting two Indian mahouts carrying out executions by elephant near Belgrade

India backs Serbia's position regarding Kosovo and its reaction to the 2008 Kosovo declaration of independence is one of non-recognition.

According to leaked US embassy cables, then U.S. Ambassador to India David C. Mulford pressured India in joining with the United States and other European countries in recognizing Kosovo's independence. But, due to India's fear that Kosovo's independence will set a precedent for Kashmir independence, made non-recognition of Kosovo's independence as India's default position.

In 2022, spokesperson of the Ministry of External Affarirs of India Arindam Bagchi stated thet India's position on Kosovo has not changed, in response to reports on the opening of the India-Kosovo Commercial Economic Office in New Delhi.

== Cultural relations ==
Serbia was one of the nations that co-sponsored Narendra Modi proposal for International Yoga Day at United Nations.

== Resident diplomatic missions ==
- India has an embassy in Belgrade.
- Serbia has an embassy in New Delhi and an honorary consulate in Chennai.

== See also ==
- Foreign relations of India
- Foreign relations of Serbia
- India–Yugoslavia relations
- Yugoslavia and the Non-Aligned Movement
