= List of planetariums =

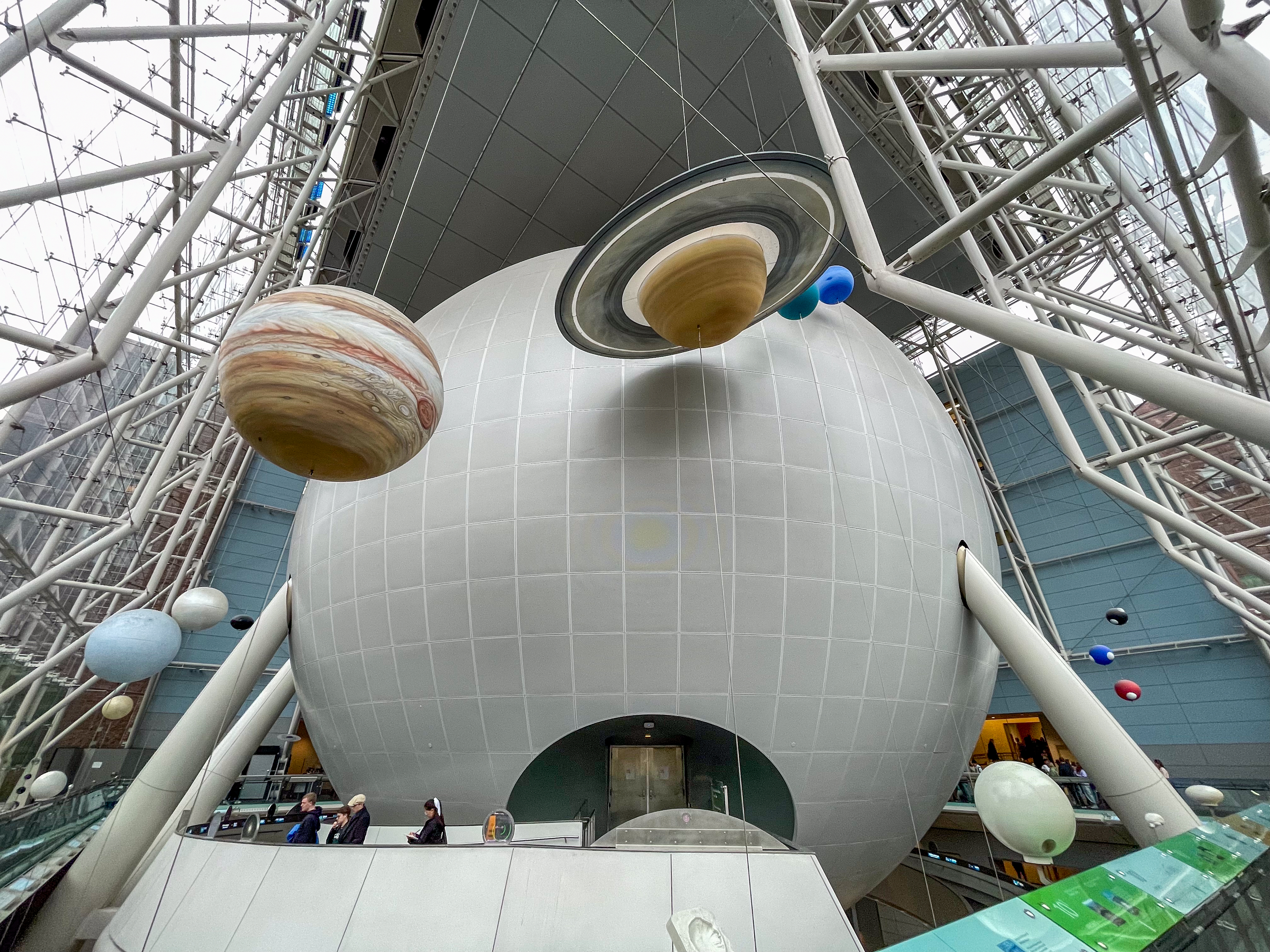
The Hayden Planetarium at the American Museum of Natural History in New York City is the most visited planetarium in the world.

This entry is a list of permanent planetariums across the world.

== Permanent planetariums ==
Planetariums are ordered by continent and then by country in alphabetical order. The planetariums are listed in the following format: name, city. The International Planetarium Society has a more complete list on its website.

=== Africa ===
==== Algeria ====
- Complexe Culturel Abdelwahab Salim, Tipaza
- Planetarium de Ghardaia, Ghardaia

==== Egypt ====
- Arab Academy for Science and Technology Planetarium, Alexandria
- The Child Museum, Cairo
- Planetarium Science Center, Alexandria
- Suez Discovery & Science Center, Suez

==== Ghana ====
- Ghana Planetarium, Accra

==== Libya ====
- Planetarium of Tripoli, Al-Quba Al-Falakia, Tripoli, Libya

==== South Africa ====
- Iziko Planetarium at the Iziko South African Museum, Cape Town
- Johannesburg Planetarium at University of the Witwatersrand, Johannesburg
- Sutherland Planetarium
- Naval Hill Planetarium, Bloemfontein

==== Tunisia ====
- Planetarium of Tunis Science City, Tunis

=== Asia ===
==== Bangladesh ====
- Novo Theatre, Dhaka
- Novo Theatre, Rajshahi

==== China ====
- Beijing Planetarium, Beijing
- Hong Kong Space Museum, Tsim Sha Tsui, Hong Kong
- Macao Science Center, Macao
- Shanghai Astronomy Museum, Shanghai

==== India ====
- Ahmedabad Planetarium, Nabhodarshan, Kankaria, Balwatika, Ahmedabad, Gujarat
- Akola Planetarium, Nehru Park, Akola, Maharashtra
- Alexa Planetarium, Haryana.
- Aryabhatta Research Institute of Observational Sciences, Nainital, Uttarakhand.
- Anna Science Centre, Tiruchirappalli
- Asha Kiran Planetarium, Belagavi, Karnataka
- BITS, Pilani Science Centre, Pilani, Rajasthan.
- Bhagalpur Planetarium, Bhagalpur, Bihar
- Birla Planetarium, Chennai
- Birla Planetarium, Hyderabad
- Birla Planetarium, Jaipur
- Birla Planetarium, Kolkata
- Darbhanga Planetarium, Darbhanga
- Devasthal Observatory, Uttrakhand.
- Dr APJ Abdul Kalam Planetarium, Burla, Sambalpur
- Dr.T.M.A Pai Planetarium, Manipal
- Efforts Planetarium, Ahmednagar
- Gandhi Hill Planetarium, Vijayawada, Andhra Pradesh
- Guwahati Planetarium, Guwahati
- Howrah Planetarium and Astronomical Research Centre, Howrah
- Indira Gandhi Planetarium, Lucknow
- Indira Gandhi Planetarium, Patna
- Jawahar Planetarium, Allahabad
- Jawaharlal Nehru Planetarium, Bengaluru
- Kalpana Chawla planatorium in Jyotisar (Kurukshetra), Haryana.
- Kusumbai Motichand Planetarium, Pune
- North Lakhimpur Science Centre and Planetarium, Lakhimpur District, Assam
- Leo Planetaria, New Delhi
- Meghnad Saha Planetarium, Burdwan
- MGM APJ Abdul Kalam Astrospace Science Centre & Club, Aurangabad, Maharashtra
- Modern High School For Girls Planetarium, Kolkata
- Nehru Planetarium, Mumbai
- Nehru Planetarium, New Delhi
- Planetarium, Muzaffarpur, Bihar
- Priyadarshini Planetarium at the Kerala Science and Technology Museum, Thiruvananthapuram
- Raman Science center Planetarium, Nagpur
- Regional Science Centre and Planetarium, Kozhikode
- Samanta Chandra Sekhera Planetarium, Bhubaneswar
- Sardar Patel Planetarium, Vadodara, Gujarat
- Sri Sathya Sai Space Theatre, Puttaparthi
- Stardome, College of Engineering, Trivandrum
- Swami Vivekananda Planetarium, Mangaluru
- Tara Mandir, Porbandar, Gujarat
- Temple of Vedic Planetarium, Mayapur
- Varahamihir Planetarium, Ranchi
- Ujjain Planetarium, Ujjain
- Vir Bahadur Singh Planetarium, Gorakhpur
- Science Centre, Surat, Gujarat
- Salem Science park - Digital Planetarium Salem, Tamilnadu
- Vratino Planetarium, Gorakhpur
- VSRC Planetarium, Gorakhpur
- Yashwantrao chavan planetarium, Nashik, Maharashtra

==== Indonesia ====
- Jagad Raya Planetarium, Tenggarong
- Jakarta Planetarium, Jakarta
- Loka Jala Crana Planetarium, Surabaya

==== Iraq ====
- Baghdad Planetarium, Baghdad

==== Israel ====
- Eretz Israel Museum Planetarium, Tel Aviv
- Givatayim Observatory, Givatayim
- Wise Observatory, Mitzpe Ramon

==== Japan ====
- Akashi Municipal Planetarium, Akashi, Carl Zeiss Jena Universal 23/3 (Z)
- Ehime Prefectural Science Museum, Niihama, SUPER-HELIOS (G)
- Hukui, MS-10(M)
- Gifu City Science Museum, Gifu, INFINIUM (M)
- Hiroshima Children's Museum, Hiroshima, MS-20AT(M)
- Ibaraki Tukuba, Geministar (M)
- Ishikawa, GM-15T (G)
- Kagawa, GSS-HELIOS (G)
- Kawasaki Municipal Science Museum, Kawasaki, MEGASTAR-III FUSION (Ohira Tech)
- Kobe Science Museum, Kobe, GSS-KOBE + Virtualium II (G)
- Kyoto, INFINIUMγ-KYOTO (M)
- Mie, INFINIUM (M)
- Miraikan, Tokyo, MEGASTAR-II Cosmos
- Nagano, GSS-URANUS (G)
- Nagoya City Science Museum, Nagoya
- Nara, MEGASTAR-ZERO (O)
- Niigata Science Museum, Niigata, CHRONOS II EX Hybride (G)
- Okayama, MS-10 (M)
- Osaka, INFINIUM-Sigma-Osaka(M) + Media Globe-Sigma SE (M, RSA)
- Saitama, INFINIUM (M)
- Saji Observatory, Tottori
- Sapporo Science Center, Sapporo, GSS-URANUS (G) + SKYMAX-DS (M)
- Shiga INFINIUMγ (M)
- Shimane, INFINIUMβ (M)
- Shizuoka, Hamamatsu, Geministar III (M)
- Sunshine City, Tokyo, INFINIUM-S (M)
- Tokushima, Super-HELIOS (G)
- Toyama, VIRTUARIUM II (G)
- Wakayama, MS-10 (M)
- Yamaguchi
- Yamanasi, MEGASTAR-IIA (Ohira Tech)
- Yokohama Science Center, Yokohama, Super-HELIOS (G)

==== Kuwait ====
- Kuwait Planetarium

==== Kazakhstan ====
- Aktobe Planetarium

==== Malaysia ====
- Melaka Planetarium, Malacca
- Planetarium Negara, Kuala Lumpur
- Sultan Iskandar Planetarium, Sarawak

==== Myanmar ====
- Yangon Planetarium, Yangon

==== Pakistan ====
- PIA Institute of Planetaria, Astronomy & Cosmology (PIA-IPAC), Karachi
- PIA Institute of Planetaria, Astronomy & Cosmology (PIA-IPAC), Lahore
- PIA Institute of Planetaria, Astronomy & Cosmology (PIA-IPAC), Peshawar

==== Philippines ====
- National Museum Planetarium, Manila
- PAGASA Planetarium, Quezon City
- DOST-PAGASA Mindanao Planetarium, Mindanao

==== South Korea ====
- Gwacheon National Science Museum Planetarium, Gwacheon
- National Science Museum, Daejeon
- Eunpyung Planetarium, Seoul National Science Museum, Seoul

==== Sri Lanka ====
- Sri Lanka Planetarium, Colombo

==== Taiwan ====
- Taipei Astronomical Museum, Taipei
- National Museum of Natural Science, Taichung
- Tainan Astronomical Education Area, Tainan

==== Thailand ====
- Bangkok Planetarium, Bangkok
- National Science Museum, Rangsit
- Rajabhat Planetarium, Phra Nakhon Si Ayutthaya
- Rangsit Science Centre for Education, Pathumthani Province
- Ban Moh Astronomy Center, Saraburi Province
- Astronomy and Science Center, Mahidol Wittayanusorn School
- Hatyai Deepsky Observation for Science, Hatyai
- Roiet Science and Cultural Centre for Education, Roi Et Province
- Nakhon Ratchasima Regional Observation For The Public, Suranaree University of Technology
- Astronomy and Science Center, Nakhon Ratchasima Province
- Regional Observation for the Public, Chachoengsao Province

==== Turkmenistan ====
- Ashgabad Planetarium, Ashgabad

=== Europe ===
==== Austria ====
- Digitales Planetarium im Naturhistorischen Museum Wien, Vienna
- Sternenturm Planetarium Judenburg, Judenburg
- Zeiss Planetarium der Stadt Wien, Vienna

==== Belarus ====
- Minsk Planetarium, Minsk

==== Belgium ====
- Brussels Planetarium, Brussels
- Europlanetarium Genk, Genk
- Planetarium Volkssterrenwacht Urania, Hove
- Planètarium Olympus Mons, Mons
- Planétarium, Université de Liège, Liège
- Volkssterrenwacht vzw Beisbroek, Bruges

==== Bulgaria ====
- NAOP Gabrovo, Gabrovo
- NAOP Smolyan, Smolyan
- NAOP Varna, Varna
- NAOP Yambol, Yambol
- Planetarium of Plovdiv, Plovdiv
- Public Astronomical Observatory and Planetarium, Dimitrovgrad

==== Croatia ====
- Astronomical Centre Rijeka, Rijeka
- Nikola Tesla Technical Museum Planetarium, Zagreb

==== Cyprus ====
- The Cyprus Planetarium, Nicosia

==== Czech Republic ====
- Brno Observatory and Planetarium, Brno
- Observatory and Planetarium České Budějovice České Budějovice
- Observatory and Planetarium Hradec Králové, Hradec Králové
- Observatory and Planetarium of Johanna Palisy, Ostrava
- Observatory and Planetarium Plzeň, Plzeň
- Observatory and Planetarium Teplice, Teplice
- Planetarium Most, Most
- Planetarium Praha, Prague

==== Denmark ====
- Orion Planetarium, Jels
- The Steno Museum, Aarhus
- Tycho Brahe Planetarium, Copenhagen

==== Estonia ====
- Planetarium in Science Centre AHHAA, Tartu
- Planetarium in Tartu Old Observatory
- Planetarium in Pernova Nature House, Pärnu
- Planetarium in Energy Discovery Centre, Tallinn

==== Finland ====
- Heureka Planetarium, Vantaa
- Kallioplanetaario, Jyväskylä
- Särkänniemi Planetarium, Tampere
- Ursa Starlab, Helsinki
- Kakslauttanen Planetarium, Saariselkä

==== France ====
- Astrorama, La Trinité, Alpes-Maritimes
- Centre d'Études et de Réalisations Astronomiques Pégoud de Belfort
- Cité de l'espace, Toulouse
- Ludiver, La Hague
- Observatoire de Strasbourg, Strasbourg
- Palais de la Découverte, Paris
- Planétarium, Nantes
- Planétarium, Rheims
- Planetarium Galilee, Montpellier
- Espace des sciences, Rennes
- Planétarium, Saint-Étienne
- Parc du Cosmos, Les Angles, Gard
- Planétarium, Vaulx-en-Velin

==== Germany ====
- Bochum Planetarium, Bochum
- Carl-Zeiss-Planetarium, Stuttgart
- Drebach Planetarium, Drebach
- ESO Supernova Planetarium & Visitor Centre, Garching bei München
- Freiburg Planetarium, Freiburg
- Hamburg Planetarium, Hamburg
- Lichtenstein Planetarium, Lichtenstein
- Lernort Planetarium Wittenberg J. G. Galle, Lutherstadt Wittenberg
- Mannheim Planetarium, Mannheim
- Nicolaus Copernicus Planetarium, Nuremberg
- Olbers-Planetarium, Bremen
- Planetarium am Insulaner, Berlin
- Planetarium Laupheim, Laupheim
- Planetarium Osnabrück im Museum am Schölerberg, Osnabrück
- Planetarium Sternwarte Feuerstein, Ebermannstadt
- Sparkassen-Planetarium Augsburg, Augsburg
- Westphalian Museum of Natural History, Münster
- Wolfsburg Planetarium, Wolfsburg
- Zeiss Major Planetarium, Berlin
- Zeiss-Planetarium Jena, Jena
- Planetarium im Astronomischen Zentrum Gera, Gera
- Schul- und Volkssternwarte Suhl, Suhl

==== Greece ====
- Eugenides Planetarium (see also Evgenidio Foundation), Athens
- Thessaloniki Planetarium, Thessaloniki

==== Hungary ====
- Budapest Planetarium (hu:TIT Budapesti Planetárium), Budapest
- Kecskemét Planetarium, Kecskemét
- Bukk Astronomical Observatory (hu:Bükki Csillagda), Répáshuta

==== Ireland ====
- Inishowen Planetarium, Inishowen
- Schull Planetarium, Schull

==== Italy ====
- Civico Planetario, Milan
- "Ignazio Danti" Planetarium, Perugia
- Parco Astronomico SIDEREUS, Salve (Lecce)
- Planetario Italian Naval Academy, Livorno
- Planetario Aula Didattica, Bologna
- Planetario Civico, Ravenna
- Planetario Comunale, Modena
- Planetario Comunale, Frasso Sabino
- Planetario Crespano del Grappa, Crespano del Grappa
- Planetario del Comune di Pisa, Pisa
- Planetario di Firenze, Florence
- Planetario di Lecco, Lecco
- Planetario di Torino, Turin
- Planetarium di Venezia Lido San Nicolo, Venice
- Planetario digitale del Parco astronomico La torre del sole, Brembate di Sopra
- Planetario Galileo, Padua
- Planetario Garda, Garda
- Planetario Genova, Genoa
- Planetario Istituto Nautico "Alfredo Cappellini", Livorno
- Planetarío Itínerante, S. M. Maddalena
- Planetario Lumezzane, Lumezzane
- Planetario Luserna San Giovanni, Luserna San Giovanni
- Planetario Museo di Storia Naturale, Livorno
- Planetario Napoli, Naples
- Planetario Prato, Prato
- Planetario Reggio Calabria, Reggio Calabria
- Planetario San Giovanni in Persiceto, San Giovanni in Persiceto
- Planetario Teatro delle Scienze e Planetario, Alessandria
- Planetario Trieste, Trieste
- Planetario Venezia, Venice
- Planetarium Viareggio, Viareggio

==== Kosovo ====
- Kosovo Planetarium of Çabrat, Gjakova, Scien.-Edu. Center Cosmos & Human
- National Observatory and Planetarium of Kosovo, Shtime

==== Lithuania ====
- Planetariumas, Vilnius

==== Malta ====
- Esplora Interactive Science Centre, Kalkara

==== Netherlands ====
- Artis Planetarium, Amsterdam
- Eise Eisinga Planetarium, Franeker
- Omniversum, The Hague
- Planetarium Planetron, Dwingeloo
- Planetarium Ridderkerk, Museum Johannes Postschool, Ridderkerk-Rijsoord

==== Norway ====
- Vitensenteret i Trondheim (Trondheim Science Center), Trondheim
- Nordnorsk vitensenter (Science Center of Northern Norway), Tromsø
- Saint Exupery Planetarium, Oslo
- Science Factory (Vitenfabrikken, Norway), Sandnes

==== Poland ====
- ORBITEK - Portable Planetarium Katowice
- Dziewulski Planetarium, Toruń
- The Heavens of Copernius in Copernicus Science Centre, Warsaw
- Planeta Anuka Portable Planetarium, Warsaw
- Planetarium and Observatory, Kielce
- Planetarium, Częstochowa
- Planetarium Frombork, Frombork
- Planetarium, Gdynia-Oksywie
- Planetarium i Obserwatorium Astronomiczne im. Mikołaja Kopernika, Grudziądz
- Planetarium im. Antoniego Ledóchowskiego, Gdynia
- Planetarium in the Extreme Park, Ustroń – commercial
- Planetarium in Palace of Culture and Science, Warsaw
- Planetarium of the Institute of Navigation, Szczecin
- Planetarium of the School Society of Amateur Astronomers, Potarzyca
- Planetarium, Olsztyn
- Planetarium, Poznań
- Planetarium Wenus, Zielona Góra
- Planetarium, Wrocław
- Portable Planetariums Home – Poland Branch
- Silesian Planetarium, Chorzów – biggest and oldest planetarium in Poland (opened in 1955, 23-meter dome)
- SOPP Planetarium and Observatory, Łódź
- Youth observatory – Niepołomice

==== Portugal ====
- Calouste Gulbenkian Planetarium, Lisbon
- Espinho Planetarium, Navegar Foundation, Espinho
- Planetario Coimbra, Coimbra
- Planetário do Porto, Porto

==== Romania ====
- Argeș County Museum, Pitești
- Baia Mare Astronomy Complex, Maramureș county, Baia Mare
- Bârlad Planetarium, Bârlad
- Brașov Planetarium at Zoo Brașov, Brașov, opened in 2019, the largest in the country
- Constanța Planetarium, Constanța
- Galați Planetarium, Galați
- Planetarium within the "Alexandru Ioan Cuza" University, Iași
- Planetarium within Universitatea de Vest, Timișoara
- Suceava Planetarium, Suceava

==== Russia ====
- Barnaul Planetarium (Барнаульский планетарий), Barnaul
- Irkutsk Planetarium, Irkutsk Planetarium (Иркутский планетарий), Irkutsk
- Kaluga Planetarium, Konstantin Tsiolkovsky museum, (Калужский планетарий), Kaluga
- Khabarovsk Planetarium, Khabarovsk
- Kirov Planetarium, (Кировский планетарий) Kirov, Kirov Oblast
- Kostroma Planetarium, Kostroma
- Moscow Planetarium (Московский планетарий), Moscow
- Nizhny Novgorod Planetarium (Нижегородский планетарий, Nizhny Novgorod Planetarium), Nizhny Novgorod
- Novokuznetsk Planetarium, (Новокузнецкий планетарий), Novokuznetsk
- Novosibirsk Planetarium, Siberian Geodetical State Academy, Novosibirsk
- Omsk Planetarium, Omsk
- Penza Planetarium (Пензенский планетарий), Penza
- Perm Planetarium, Perm
- Planetarium in Lakhta Center, Saint Petersburg
- Planetarium No.1 in Saint Petersburg, Saint Petersburg
- Pulkovo Observatory (Central Astronomical Observatory of the Russian Academy of Sciences at Pulkovo), 19 km south of Saint Petersburg on Pulkovo Heights
- Saint Petersburg Planetarium, Saint Petersburg
- Saratov Planetarium, Saratov
- Ufa Planetarium, (Уфимский планетарий), Ufa
- Vladimir Planetarium, (Владимирский планетарий), Vladimir
- Volgograd Planetarium (Волгоградский планетарий), Volgograd

==== Serbia ====
- Belgrade Planetarium, Belgrade
- Novi Sad Planetarium

==== Slovakia ====
- Slovenské technické múzeum, Košice
- CVC Domino, Košice
- Observatory and planetarium Milan Rastislav Štefánik, Hlohovec
- Observatory and planetarium Presov, Prešov
- Observatory Vihorlat, Kolonické sedlo
- Regional Observatory and Planetarium Maximilian Hell, Žiar nad Hronom
- Slovak central observatory Hurbanovo, Hurbanovo

==== Spain ====
- Centro Astronomico Aragonés, Huesca
- Hogar de los Planetarios Portátiles – Base en Tenerife
- L'Hemisfèric, Valencia
- Madrid Planetarium, Madrid, MEGASTAR-IIA (Ohira Tech)
- Planetario A Coruña, A Coruña
- Planetario Alcobendas, Alcobendas
- Planetario Arrecife, Arrecife
- Planetario Badalona, Badalona
- Planetario Barcelona, Barcelona
- Planetario Costitx, Costitx
- Planetario de la Escuela superior marina civil, Santander
- Planetario de Pamplona, Pamplona
- Planetario de Valladolid, El, Valladolid
- Planetario del Museo de las Ciencias, Cuenca
- Planetario Didactico, Alicante
- Planetario Educa Ciencia Madrid
- Planetario Granada, Granada
- Planetario Malaga, Málaga
- Planetario Murcia, Murcia
- Planetario Salamanca, Salamanca
- Planetario San Sebastián, San Sebastián
- Planetario Sevilla, Seville
- Planetario Tenerife, Tenerife
- Planetarios Móvil Digital Eurocosmos Madrid

==== Sweden ====
- Broman Planetarium AB, Angered, Gothenburg
- Cosmonova, Stockholm
- Kosmorama Planetarium, Borlänge
- Norrköpings Visualiseringscenter C, Norrköping
- Planetariet Lund, Lund
- Planetarium at the House of Technology, Luleå
- Planetarium Härnösand, Härnösand
- Planetarium Project, Frösön
- Planetarium Upptech, Jönköping
- Sölvesborg Ynde Planetarium
- Stella Nova Planetarium, Falun
- Tom Tits Experiment, Södertälje
- Umevatoriet, Umeå
- Universeum, Gothenburg

==== Switzerland ====
- Planetarium at Swiss Museum of Transport, Swiss Museum of Transport, Luzern
- Sternwarte - Planetarium SIRIUS, Schwanden near Sigriswil

==== Turkey ====
- Bursa Science and Technology Center, Bursa
- Eskişehir Planetarium, Eskişehir
- Gaziantep Planetarium and Science Center, Gaziantep
- Kayseri Science Center, Kayseri
- Konya Science Center, Konya
- Serdivan Planetarium, Sakarya
- Sancaktepe Science experiment Center, Observatory and Planetarium, istanbul
- Serdivan Planetarium, Sakarya
- Tuzla Municipality – Şelale Eğitim Parkı – Planetarium ve Observatory, Tuzla

==== Ukraine ====
- Dnipro Planetarium, Dnipro
- Donetsk Planetarium, Donetsk
- Kharkiv Planetarium, Kharkiv
- Kyiv Planetarium, Kyiv

==== United Kingdom ====
- Aberdeen College Planetarium, Aberdeen, Scotland
- Armagh Planetarium, Armagh, Northern Ireland
- The Astronomy Centre Planetarium, near Todmorden, West Yorkshire, England
- AURIGA Star Dome, Belper, England
- The Wolfson Planetarium, Bedford School, Bedford, England
- Dark Sky Wales Planetarium, Pontypridd, Wales
- Glasgow College of Nautical Studies Planetarium, Glasgow, Scotland
- Glasgow Science Centre Planetarium, Glasgow,
- Jodrell Bank Observatory planetarium (closed in 2003), Macclesfield, England
- Life Science Centre planetarium, Newcastle upon Tyne, England
- Lockyer Observatory and Planetarium, Sidmouth, England
- London Mobile Planetarium, London, England
- Midlands Mobile Planetarium, Midlands, England
- National Space Centre, Leicester, England
- Natural Science Centre Planetarium, Newchapel, Staffordshire, England
- Peter Harrison Planetarium, London, England
- Planetarium Infinity, Aberystwyth, Wales
- Plymouth Planetarium, Plymouth, England
- Royal Observatory, Edinburgh, Edinburgh, Scotland
- South Downs Planetarium, Chichester, England
- Southend Central Museum, Southend-on-Sea, England
- The Spaceguard Centre Planetarium, Knighton, Powys, Wales
- StarDome - Astronomy & Astronautics, Cambridge, Cambridge & UK wide
- Techniquest Planetarium, Cardiff, Wales
- Thinktank Planetarium, Birmingham, England
- University of Glasgow Planetarium, Glasgow, Scotland
- University of St Andrews Mobile Planetarium, St. Andrews, Scotland
- Wales Mobile Planetarium Wales
- We the Curious Planetarium, Bristol, England
- Winchester Science Centre & Planetarium, Winchester, England
- Wonderdome mobile planetarium, Derbyshire, South Yorkshire, Yorkshire, Greater Manchester, Cheshire and UK wide
- World Museum planetarium, Liverpool, England
- Wynyard Woodland Park Planetarium, Thorpe Thewles, Teesside, England
- Yorkshire Planetarium, Harewood House, Leeds, England

==== Other ====
- Aboard the RMS Queen Mary 2, the first planetarium at sea

=== North America ===
==== Canada ====
===== Alberta =====
- Queen Elizabeth II Planetarium, Edmonton, Alberta
- TELUS Spark Science Centre, Calgary, Alberta
- Telus World of Science, Edmonton, Alberta

===== British Columbia =====
- Centre of the Universe, Victoria, British Columbia
- H. R. MacMillan Space Centre, Vancouver, British Columbia

===== Manitoba =====
- Manitoba Museum, Winnipeg, Manitoba

===== Ontario =====
- Doran Planetarium, Sudbury, Ontario
- Science North, Greater Sudbury, Ontario
- W.J. McCallion Planetarium, Hamilton, Ontario

===== Quebec =====
- Rio Tinto Alcan Planetarium, Montreal, Quebec

===== Yukon =====
- Northern Lights Centre, Watson Lake, Yukon

==== Costa Rica ====
- Planetario Ciudad de San José, San José

==== Mexico ====
- Complejo Cientifico, Tecnologico y Cultural Planetario de Playa Del Carmen "SAYAB", Quintana Roo
- Planetario Alfa, Monterrey
- Planetario de Cajeme en el Parque Infantil "Ostimuri", Ciudad Obregón
- Planetario de Ciudad Victoria "Dr. Ramiro Iglesias Leal" del Parque Recreativo y Cultural Siglo XXI, Ciudad Victoria
- Planetario de la Escuela Náutica Mercante de Tampico, Tampico
- Planetario Digital Móvil Ecosistemas de México, Mexico City
- Planetario "Dr. Arcadio Poveda Ricalde" del Centro Cultural de Sinaloa, Culiacán
- Planetario "Dra. Silvia Torres Castilleja", Descubre Museo Interactivo de Ciencias y Tecnología, Aguascalientes
- Planetario Explora del Museo de Ciencias, León
- Planetario Hidalgo del Museo Rehilete, Pachuca, Hidalgo
- Planetario IMAX DOMO de Puebla, Puebla
- Planetario "Joaquín Gallo" de la Sociedad Astronómica de México, Mexico City
- Planetario "José Martínez Rocha" del Área de Astronomía del DIF-US, Magdalena de Kino
- Planetario "Lic. Felipe Rivera" de CECONEXPO, Morelia
- Planetario Luis Enrique Erro, Mexico City
- Planetario Móvil de Ludocosmos, Hermosillo
- Planetronix Móvil de Sistemas Educativos en Astronomía, Guaymas
- Planetario Móvil EKBÉ, Querétaro
- Planetario Móvil "Shimba Caa Ana", Cancún
- Planetario Papalote Museo del Niño, Mexico City
- Planetario Tabasco 2000, Villahermosa
- Planetario "Valente Souza" de la Sociedad Astronómica de México, Mexico City
- Planetario y Centro Interactivo de Jalisco "Lunaria", Guadalajara, Jalisco, Mexico
- Ziga Zag, Centro de Ciencias, Consejo Zacatecano de Ciencia y Tecnología, Zacatecas

==== United States ====
===== Alabama =====
- Boyd E. Christenberry Planetarium, Homewood
- W. A. Gayle Planetarium, Montgomery
- Wernher von Braun Planetarium+
- INTUITIVE Planetarium, U.S. Space & Rocket Center, Huntsville

===== Alaska =====
- Babula Planetarium at the University of Alaska Museum of the North Fairbanks
- Marie Drake Planetarium, Juneau
- Thomas Planetarium at the Anchorage Museum, Anchorage
- University of Alaska Planetarium & Visualization Theater Anchorage

===== Arizona =====
- Dorrance Planetarium at the Arizona Science Center, Phoenix
- Flandrau Science Center and Planetarium at the University of Arizona, Tucson
- Jim and Linda Lee Planetarium
- Planetarium at Mesa Community College
- The Star Barn Cave Creek

===== Arkansas =====
- EpiSphere at the Aerospace Education Center, Little Rock

===== California =====
- Charles F. Hager Planetarium at San Francisco State University, San Francisco
- Chabot Space and Science Center, Oakland
- College of San Mateo, San Mateo
- The Discovery Museum, Science and Space Center, Sacramento
- Fujitsu Planetarium at De Anza College, Cupertino
- Griffith Observatory, Los Angeles
- Holt Planetarium, Lawrence Hall of Science, Berkeley
- Morrison Planetarium at the California Academy of Sciences, San Francisco
- Orange Coast College Planetarium, Costa Mesa
- Palomar College Planetarium, San Marcos
- Planetarium Projector and Science Museum, a museum of planeteria at Big Bear Lake
- Rosicrucian Egyptian Museum, San Jose, a purpose-built planetarium rendered in an Ancient Egyptian architectural style
- San Diego City College Planetarium, San Diego
- Hartnell College Planetarium, Salinas
- Schreder Planetarium, Redding
- Tessmann Planetarium at Santa Ana College, Santa Ana
- William Luebke Planetarium, at Modesto Junior College West Campus Science Community Center, Modesto

===== Colorado =====
- Fiske Planetarium at the University of Colorado at Boulder, Boulder
- Gates Planetarium at Denver Museum of Nature and Science, Denver
- United States Air Force Academy Planetarium at United States Air Force Academy, Colorado Springs

===== Connecticut =====
- The Children's Museum, West Hartford
- The Discovery Museum, Bridgeport
- Leitner Family Observatory and Planetarium at Yale University, New Haven
- Treworgy Planetarium at Mystic Seaport, Mystic

===== District of Columbia =====
- Albert Einstein Planetarium, National Air and Space Museum, Smithsonian Institution
- Rock Creek Park Planetarium, Rock Creek Park Nature Center

===== Florida =====
- Bishop Planetarium at Bishop Museum of Science and Nature, Bradenton, Florida
- Bryan-Gooding Planetarium in the Alexander Brest Science Theatre at the Museum of Science and History, Jacksonville, Florida
- Buehler Planetarium and Observatory, Davie, Florida
- Calusa Nature Center and Planetarium, Fort Myers, Florida
- The Challenger Learning Center, Tallahassee
- Eastern Florida State College Planetarium & Observatory (closed indefinitely due to hurricane damage), Cocoa
- Frost Planetarium at Phillip and Patricia Frost Museum of Science, Miami
- Hallstrom Planetarium at Indian River State College, Fort Pierce
- Kika Silva Pla Planetarium at Santa Fe College, Gainesville
- Lohman Planetarium at Museum of Arts and Sciences (Daytona Beach), Daytona Beach, Florida
- Saunders Planetarium at Museum of Science & Industry, Tampa
- Seminole State College Planetarium at Seminole State College of Florida, Sanford
- St. Petersburg College, St. Petersburg

===== Georgia =====
- Jim Cherry Memorial Planetarium at the Fernbank Science Center, Atlanta
- Mark Smith Planetarium at the Museum of Arts and Sciences, Macon
- Omnisphere Theater, Coca-Cola Challenger Space Science Center, Columbus State University, Columbus
- Rollins Planetarium at Young Harris College, Young Harris
- Tellus Planetarium at Tellus: Northwest Georgia Science Museum, Cartersville
- Wetherbee Planetarium at Thronateeska Heritage Center, Albany

===== Guam =====
- University of Guam Planetarium at the University of Guam, Hagåtña

===== Hawaii =====
- Hōkūlani Imaginarium, Windward Community College, Kāne‘ohe, Hawai‘i
- ʻImiloa Astronomy Center, Hilo
- Jhamandas Watumull Planetarium at the Bernice P. Bishop Museum, Honolulu

===== Idaho =====
- Capital High School, Boise

===== Illinois =====
- Adler Planetarium, Chicago
- Cernan Earth and Space Center, Triton College, River Grove
- Discovery Center Museum, Rockford
- Illinois State University Planetarium, Normal
- Lakeview Museum planetarium, Peoria (closed 2012)
- Peoria Riverfront Museum, Peoria
- Staerkel Planetarium, Parkland College, Champaign
- Strickler Planetarium at Olivet Nazarene University, Bourbonnais
- Waubonsie Valley High School planetarium Aurora

===== Indiana =====
- Arthur M. Klinger Planetarium at Bittersweet Elementary School, Mishawaka, Indiana
- Ball State University, Muncie, Indiana
- Bellmont High School, Decatur
- Beyond Spaceship Earth at Indianapolis Children's Museum, Indianapolis, Indiana
- Clifford Pierce Middle School, Merrillville, Indiana
- Carmel High School, Hamilton
- Floyd Central High School, Floyds Knobs, Indiana
- Holcomb Observatory and Planetarium at Butler University, Indianapolis
- Jefferson High School, Lafayette
- Kennedy Academy, South Bend, St. Joseph County
- Koch Planetarium, Evansville
- Marion High School, Marion
- Northrop High School Fort Wayne, Indiana
- Pike High School, Indianapolis
- SpaceQuest Planetarium at Indianapolis Children's Museum, Indianapolis, Indiana (closed)

===== Iowa =====
- Bettendorf High School, Bettendorf
- Sanford Museum and Planetarium, Cherokee, Iowa

===== Kansas =====
- Justice Planetarium at the Kansas Cosmosphere and Space Center, Hutchinson
- Lakin High School Lakin, Kansas
- Peterson Planetarium at Emporia State University

===== Kentucky =====
- Gheen's Science Hall & Rauch Planetarium at the University of Louisville, Louisville
- Golden Pond Planetarium and Observatory, Golden Pond
- Hardin Planetarium at Western Kentucky University, Bowling Green
- Hummel Planetarium at Eastern Kentucky University, Richmond
- Star Theater, at Morehead State University, Morehead
- Varia Planetarium (part of East Kentucky Science Center) at Big Sandy Community and Technical College, Prestonsburg

===== Louisiana =====
- Dayna & Ronald L. Sawyer Space Dome Planetarium, Shreveport
- Irene W. Pennington Planetarium, Baton Rouge
- Audubon Planetarium & Nature Dome Theater at Audubon Louisiana Nature Center, New Orleans

===== Maine =====
- Francis Malcolm Science Center Planetarium at Easton, Maine, 776 Houlton Road
- Ladd Planetarium at Bates College, Lewiston, 44 Campus Avenue
- Maynard F. Jordan Planetarium at the University of Maine, Orono
- Southworth Planetarium at University of Southern Maine - Portland campus located at 70 Falmouth Street

===== Maryland =====
- Arthur Storer Planetarium, Prince Frederick, named after the first astronomer in the American colonies and the original namesake of Halley's Comet
- Davis Planetarium at the Maryland Science Center, Baltimore
- Montgomery College Planetarium, Takoma Park
- James E. Richmond Science Center and Planetarium, Charles County Public Schools, Waldorf (60' diameter, 184 seats)
- Planetarium at Towson University
- William Brish Planetarium

===== Massachusetts =====
- Charles Hayden Planetarium at the Museum of Science, Boston
- Framingham State College Planetarium, Framingham
- George Alden Planetarium at the Ecotarium, Worcester
- Seymour Planetarium at the Springfield Science Museum, Springfield, the oldest operating planetarium in the United States

===== Michigan =====
- Abrams Planetarium, Michigan State University, East Lansing
- Argus Planetarium, Ann Arbor
- Besser Museum for Northeast Michigan, Alpena
- Cranbrook Planetarium, Bloomfield Hills
- Dassault Systèmes Planetarium, Michigan Science Center, Detroit
- Delta College Planetarium & Learning Center, Bay City
- John Glenn High School, Westland, Michigan
- Kingman Museum Planetarium, Battle Creek
- Longway Planetarium, Flint
- Mount Clemens High School, Mount Clemens, Michigan
- Roger B. Chaffee Planetarium, Public Museum of Grand Rapids, Grand Rapids
- Roseville High School, Roseville, Michigan
- Shiras Planetarium, Marquette
- Lake Superior State University, Sault Ste. Marie, Michigan

===== Minnesota =====
- Como Planetarium, Como Park Elementary School, St. Paul
- Forestview Planetarium, Forestview Middle School, Baxter
- Marshall W. Alworth Planetarium, University of Minnesota Duluth, Duluth, Minnesota
- Mayo High School, Rochester
- MSUM Planetarium, Minnesota State University Moorhead, Moorhead
- Paulucci Space Theatre, Hibbing Community College, Hibbing
- SMSU Planetarium, Southwest Minnesota State University, Marshall
- Whitney and Elizabeth MacMillan Planetarium, Bell Museum of Natural History, St. Paul

===== Mississippi =====
- Russell C. Davis Planetarium, Jackson

===== Missouri =====
- Del & Norma Robison Planetarium, Kirksville
- Gottlieb Planetarium, Kansas City
- James S. McDonnell Planetarium, St. Louis
- Rock Bridge Senior High School Planetarium, Columbia

===== Montana =====
- Taylor Planetarium at the Museum of the Rockies

===== Nebraska =====
- Mallory Kountze Planetarium (UNO), Omaha
- Martin Luther King Jr. Planetarium, Omaha
- Ralph Mueller Planetarium, Lincoln

===== Nevada =====
- Fleischmann Planetarium & Science Center, Reno
- Dale Etheridge Planetarium, Las Vegas, Nevada

===== New Hampshire =====
- McAuliffe-Shepard Discovery Center, Concord

===== New Jersey =====
- Dreyfuss Planetarium at the Newark Museum, Newark
- Jennifer Chalsty Planetarium at Liberty Science Center, Jersey City, largest planetarium in the Western Hemisphere
- Longo Planetarium at County College of Morris, Randolph
- New Jersey State Museum Planetarium, Trenton
- The Planetarium at the Fair Lawn High School Astronomy Center, Fair Lawn
- The Planetarium at RVCC, North Branch
- Princeton Day School Planetarium, Princeton
- Robert J. Novins Planetarium at Ocean County College, Toms River

===== New Mexico =====
- The Planetarium at the New Mexico Museum of Natural History & Science, Albuquerque
- Early College Academy, Hefferan Planetarium, Albuquerque
- Robert H. Goddard Planetarium, Roswell

===== New York =====
- Andrus Planetarium, Hudson River Museum, Yonkers
- Bruckner Planetarium, Nassau Community College, Garden City
- Corning Community College Planetarium, Corning
- Edwin A. Link Planetarium, Roberson Museum and Science Center, Binghamton
- Edwin Hubble Planetarium, in Edward R. Murrow High School, Brooklyn
- Hayden Planetarium American Museum of Natural History, New York City
- JetBlue Sky Theater Planetarium, Cradle of Aviation Museum, Garden City
- Muse Planetarium, Brooklyn Children's Museum, Brooklyn
- Northeast Bronx Planetarium, in Harry Truman High School, Bronx
- Shineman Planetarium, State University of New York at Oswego, Oswego
- Strasenburgh Planetarium, Rochester Museum and Science Center, Rochester
- Suits-Bueche Planetarium, Schenectady
- Suny Oneonta Planetarium, State University of Oneonta, Oneonta
- Tupper Planetarium, Centereach High School Centereach
- Vanderbilt Planetarium (part of Vanderbilt Museum), Centerport
- Wagner College Planetarium, Staten Island
- Whitworth Ferguson Planetarium at Buffalo State University, Buffalo
- Williamsville North High School, Williamsville

===== North Carolina =====
- Millholland Planetarium at Catawba Science Center, Hickory
- Charlotte Observer IMAX Dome Theatre (formerly called Charlotte Kelly Space Voyager Planetarium) at Discovery Place, Charlotte
- Cummins Planetarium at the Rocky Mount Children's Museum & Science Center, Rocky Mount
- ECSU Khan Planetarium at Elizabeth City State University in Elizabeth City
- Fayetteville State University Planetarium, Fayetteville (limited public shows)
- Schiele Museum of Natural History and Planetarium, Gastonia
- Greensboro Science Center, Greensboro
- Ingram Planetarium, Sunset Beach
- Millholand Planetarium at Catawba Science Center, Catawba
- Morehead Planetarium and Science Center at the University of North Carolina at Chapel Hill, Chapel Hill – the first planetarium built on a U.S. college campus
- Neuseway Nature Center and Planetarium, Kinston
- Robeson County Planetarium Science and Technology, Lumberton (limited public shows)
- Rowan-Salisbury School System's Margaret C. Woodson Planetarium in Salisbury (limited public shows)
- SciPlanetarium at Kaleideum, Winston-Salem

===== Ohio =====
- Anderson Hancock Planetarium at Marietta College, Marietta
- Appold Planetarium at Lourdes University, Sylvania
- Arne Slettebak Planetarium at The Ohio State University, Columbus
- BGSU Planetarium at Bowling Green State University, Bowling Green
- Clark Planetarium at Shawnee State University, Portsmouth
- COSI Planetarium, Center of Science and Industry, Columbus
- Drake Planetarium and Science Center, Cincinnati
- Hoover-Price Planetarium, William McKinley Presidential Library and Museum, Canton
- Ritter Planetarium & Brooks Observatory, University of Toledo, Toledo
- Shafran Planetarium at Cleveland Museum of Natural History, Cleveland
- Shaker Heights High School Planetarium at Shaker Heights, Cleveland
- Ward-Beecher Planetarium at Youngstown State University, Youngstown
- Westlake Schools Planetarium, Westlake

===== Oklahoma =====
- James E. Bertelsmeyer Planetarium at the Tulsa Air and Space Museum & Planetarium, Tulsa
- Love's Planetarium at Science Museum Oklahoma, Oklahoma City
- Mackie Planetarium, Northern Oklahoma College
- Jenks Public Schools Planetarium at Jenks High School Math Science Complex, Jenks, Oklahoma

===== Oregon =====
- North Medford High School Planetarium, Medford
- Harry C. Kendall Planetarium (part of Oregon Museum of Science and Industry), Portland
- Planetarium at Chemeketa Community College, Hayesville
- Science Factory, Eugene
- Planetarium Sky Theater, Mt. Hood Community College, Gresham, Oregon

===== Pennsylvania =====
- Bethlehem-Center Middle School, Fredericktown
- Buhl Planetarium (part of Carnegie Science Center), Pittsburgh
- Charles M. Kanev Planetarium, Dickinson College, Carlisle
- Detwiler Planetarium, Lycoming College, Williamsport
- Fels Planetarium at the Franklin Institute, Philadelphia
- Hatter Planetarium at Gettysburg College, Gettysburg
- North Hills High School, West View
- Peirce Planetarium, Clarion University, Clarion
- Planetarium at the Reading Public Museum, Reading
- The Planetarium at State Museum of Pennsylvania, Harrisburg
- Seneca Valley High School, Harmony
- Steel Valley High School, Munhall
- Ted Pedas Planetarium, Farrell Area High School
- Williamsport Area High School, Williamsport
- Yahn Planetarium at Penn State Behrend, Erie
- Edinboro University Planetarium at Edinboro University of Pennsylvania, Edinboro, Pennsylvania

===== Puerto Rico =====
- RUM Planetarium, University of Puerto Rico at Mayagüez, Mayagüez

===== Rhode Island =====
- Roger Williams Park Museum of Natural History and Planetarium, Providence

===== South Carolina =====
- Clemson University Planetarium, Clemson
- DuPont Planetarium at the University of South Carolina Aiken, Aiken
- SCSM Planetarium, Columbia
- Stanback Planetarium, Orangeburg
- T. C. Hooper Planetarium at the Roper Mountain Science Center, Greenville

===== Tennessee =====
- Bays Mountain Planetarium at Bays Mountain Park, Kingsport
- Heavens Declare Planetarium at the Wonders Center & Science Museum, Dickson
- Sharpe Planetarium at the Pink Palace Museum and Planetarium, Memphis
- Sudekum Planetarium at Adventure Science Center, Nashville
- University of Tennessee Planetarium and Observation Deck, Department of Physics and Astronomy, Knoxville
- MD Anderson Planetarium, University of Memphis Lambuth, Jackson

===== Texas =====
- Angelo State Planetarium, Angelo State University, San Angelo
- BASF Planetarium, Center for the Arts and Sciences, Clute
- Blakemore Planetarium at the Museum of the Southwest, Midland
- Burke Baker Planetarium at the Houston Museum of Natural Science, Houston
- Center for Earth and Space Science Education, Tyler Junior College, Tyler – most advanced planetarium in the state of Texas
- Gene Roddenberry Planetarium, El Paso
- Lamar Bruni Vergara Planetarium & Science Center, Texas A&M International University, Laredo, Texas
- Larry K. Forrest Memorial Planetarium, Cedar Park, now closed
- Mayborn Science Theater, Central Texas College, Killeen
- Moody Planetarium Museum of Texas Tech University, Lubbock
- Noble Planetarium, Museum of Science & History, Fort Worth
- The Planetarium at UT Arlington, Arlington
- Scobee Planetarium, San Antonio College, San Antonio
- The Stephen F. Austin Planetarium at Stephen F. Austin State University, Nacogdoches
- East Texas A&M University Planetarium East Texas A&M University, Commerce, Texas

===== Utah =====
- Clark Planetarium, Salt Lake City
- Ott Planetarium at Weber State University, Ogden
- Royden G. Derrick Planetarium, at Brigham Young University, Provo
- Snow Planetarium at Snow College, Ephraim
- Christa McAuliffe Space Education Center at Central Elementary, Pleasant Grove

===== Vermont =====
- Lyman Spitzer Jr. Planetarium at Fairbanks Museum in Saint Johnsbury

===== Virginia =====
- Chesapeake Planetarium, Chesapeake
- David M. Brown Planetarium, Arlington
- The Dome at the Science Museum of Virginia, Richmond, Largest screen in Virginia
- J. Calder Wicker Planetarium, Fork Union
- Herndon High School Planetarium (Fairfax County Public Schools), Herndon
- Hopkins Planetarium at the Science Museum of Western Virginia, Roanoke
- Irene V. Hylton Planetarium, Prince William County, Virginia
- John C. Wells Planetarium, Harrisonburg
- Mary D. Pretlow Planetarium, Norfolk
- Norfolk State University Planetarium, Norfolk
- Radford University Planetarium, Radford
- Virginia Living Museum, Newport News

===== Washington =====
- Pierce College Science Dome at Pierce College Fort Steilacoom, Lakewood
- CPCCo Planetarium at Columbia Basin College, Pasco
- Pacific Planetarium, Bremerton
- Spanel Planetarium at Western Washington University, Bellingham
- University of Washington Planetarium, Seattle
- Willard Geer Planetarium at Bellevue College, Bellevue
- Willard Smith Planetarium at the Pacific Science Center, Seattle
- WSU Planetarium at Washington State University, Pullman

===== Wisconsin =====
- Barlow Planetarium at the University of Wisconsin–Oshkosh, Fox Cities Campus, Menasha
- Daniel F. Soref National Geographic Dome Theater and Planetarium, Milwaukee
- Horwitz-DeRemer Planetarium at Retzer Nature Center, Waukesha
- Madison Metropolitan School District (MMSD) Planetarium, Madison
- Manfred Olsen Planetarium at the University of Wisconsin-Milwaukee, Milwaukee
- Planetarium at University of Wisconsin–La Crosse, La Crosse
- Planetarium at University of Wisconsin–River Falls, River Falls
- Planetarium at Wausau West High School, Wausau

===== Wyoming =====
- Snow King Observatory and Planetarium, Jackson

=== Oceania ===
==== Australia ====
- Science Space, Wollongong, NSW
- Melbourne, Scienceworks Museum Planetarium, Melbourne
- Queen Victoria Museum and Art Gallery, Launceston
- Scitech Planetarium, Perth
- Sir Thomas Brisbane Planetarium, Brisbane
- UNISA Planetarium, Mawson Lakes, Adelaide
- Cosmos Centre, Charleville, Queensland

==== New Zealand ====
- Sir Edmund Hillary Alpine Centre Digital Dome at Hermitage Hotel, Mount Cook Village
- Perpetual Guardian Planetarium, Tūhura Otago Museum, Dunedin
- Planetarium North, Whangārei
- Space Place at Carter Observatory, Wellington
- Stardome Observatory, Auckland

=== South America ===
==== Argentina ====
- Complejo Astronómico Municipal, Rosario
- Complejo Planetario Malargüe, Malargüe
- Galileo Galilei planetarium, Buenos Aires
- Parque Astronómico la Punta

==== Brazil ====
- Brasília Planetarium, Brasília
- Carmo Planetarium, Zeiss, São Paulo
- Centro Dragão do Mar de Arte e Cultura, Zeiss ZKP-4
- Colégio Estadual do Paraná, ZKP-1, Paraná
- Johannes Kepler Planetarium, Sabina School Park of Knowledge, Zeiss, Santo André, São Paulo
- Professor Aristóteles Orsini Planetarium, Zeiss, São Paulo
- Rio de Janeiro Planetarium Foundation, Zeiss, Rio de Janeiro
- Universidade de São Paulo, Digistar 5, São Paulo
- Universidade Estadual de Londrina, Gambato, Paraná
- Universidade Federal de Goiania Planetarium, Zeiss, Goiás
- Universidade Federal de Santa Maria Planetarium, Digistar 4, Rio Grande do Sul
- Universidade Federal de Santa Catarina Planetarium, Digistar 3, Santa Catarina
- Universidade Federal do Espírito Santo Planetarium, Zeiss, Vitória
- Universidade Federal do Rio Grande do Sul, Zeiss, Rio Grande do Sul

==== Chile ====
- Planetario Chile (University of Santiago, Chile), Carl Zeiss VI, Santiago
- Planetario Mamalluca, Municipalidad de Vicuña, Región de Coquimbo
- Planetario Rapa Nui (Fundación Planetario Rapa Nui, Chile), Isla de Pascua
- Planetario Movil Tikva, Purranque, Región Los Lagos

==== Colombia ====
- Planetarium of Bogotá, Bogotá
- Planetarium of Medellín, Medellín
- Planetarium La Enseñanza, Medellín
- Planetario Móvil Colombia, Bogotá

==== Ecuador ====
- Planetarium of Mitad del Mundo, Ciudad Mitad del Mundo-Quito
- Planetario de la Armada -Guayaquil- (INOCAR)
- Planetario Mundo Juvenil -Cuenca-
- Centro cultural Planetario -Quito- (IGM)

==== Uruguay ====
- Planetario de Montevideo "Agr. Germán Barbato", first Latin American planetarium (1955), Montevideo

==== Venezuela ====
- Planetario del Museo de los Niños de Caracas, Caracas
- Planetario Humboldt, [Zeiss] Caracas
- Planetario Fundación la Salle de Ciencias Naturales La Salle, Punta de Piedra
- Planetario Simón Bolívar (part of Complejo Científico, Cultural y Turístico), Maracaibo

== See also ==
- Amateur astronomy
