= List of tourist attractions in Tiruchirappalli =

The list of tourist attractions in Tiruchirappalli a city in Tamil Nadu state of India.

== Temples ==
- Ranganathaswamy Temple, Srirangam
- Ucchi Pillayar Temple, Rockfort
- Jambukeswarar Temple, Thiruvanaikaval
- Erumbeeswarar Temple
- Vayalur Murugan Temple

== Museums ==
- Government Museum, Tiruchirappalli
- Railway Heritage Centre, Tiruchirappalli
- Anna Science Centre, Tiruchirappalli

== Others ==
- Tiruchirapalli Rock Fort
- Tiruchirappalli Fort
- Kallanai Dam
- Tropical butterfly conservatory, Trichy
- Our Lady of Lourdes Church, Tiruchirappalli
- Mukkombu

== Gallery ==
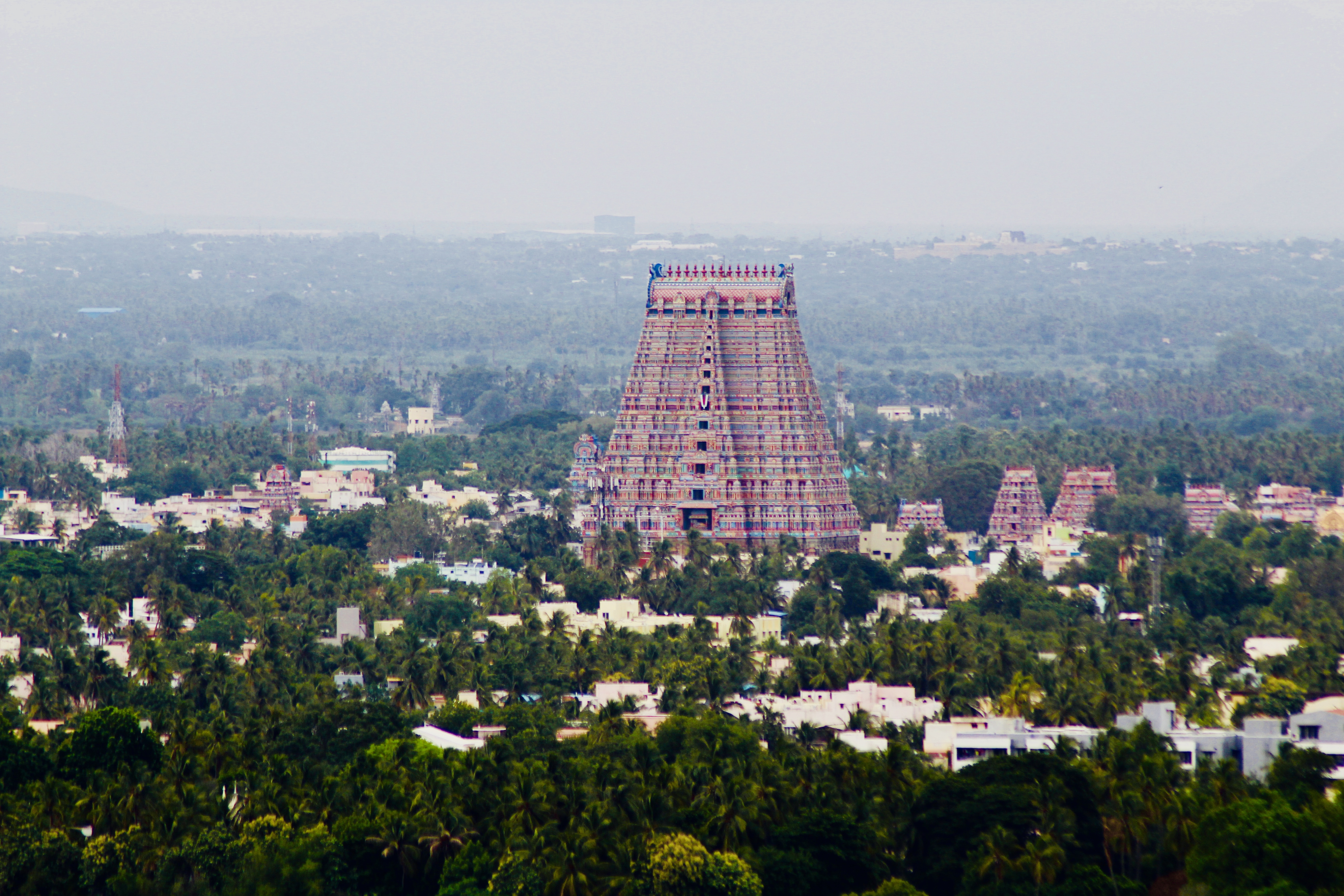
Srirangam temple complex across the river on left

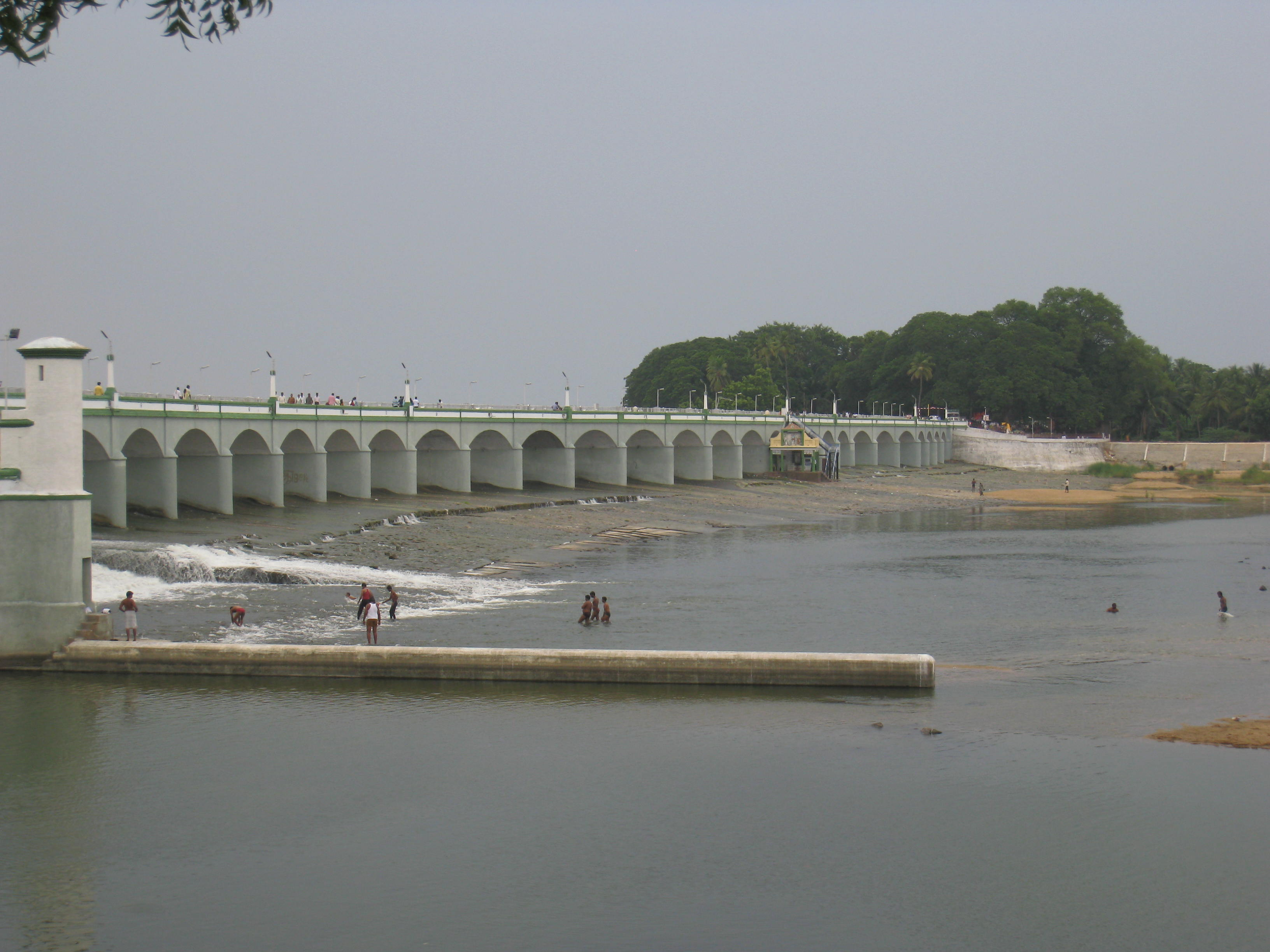
Kallanai dam

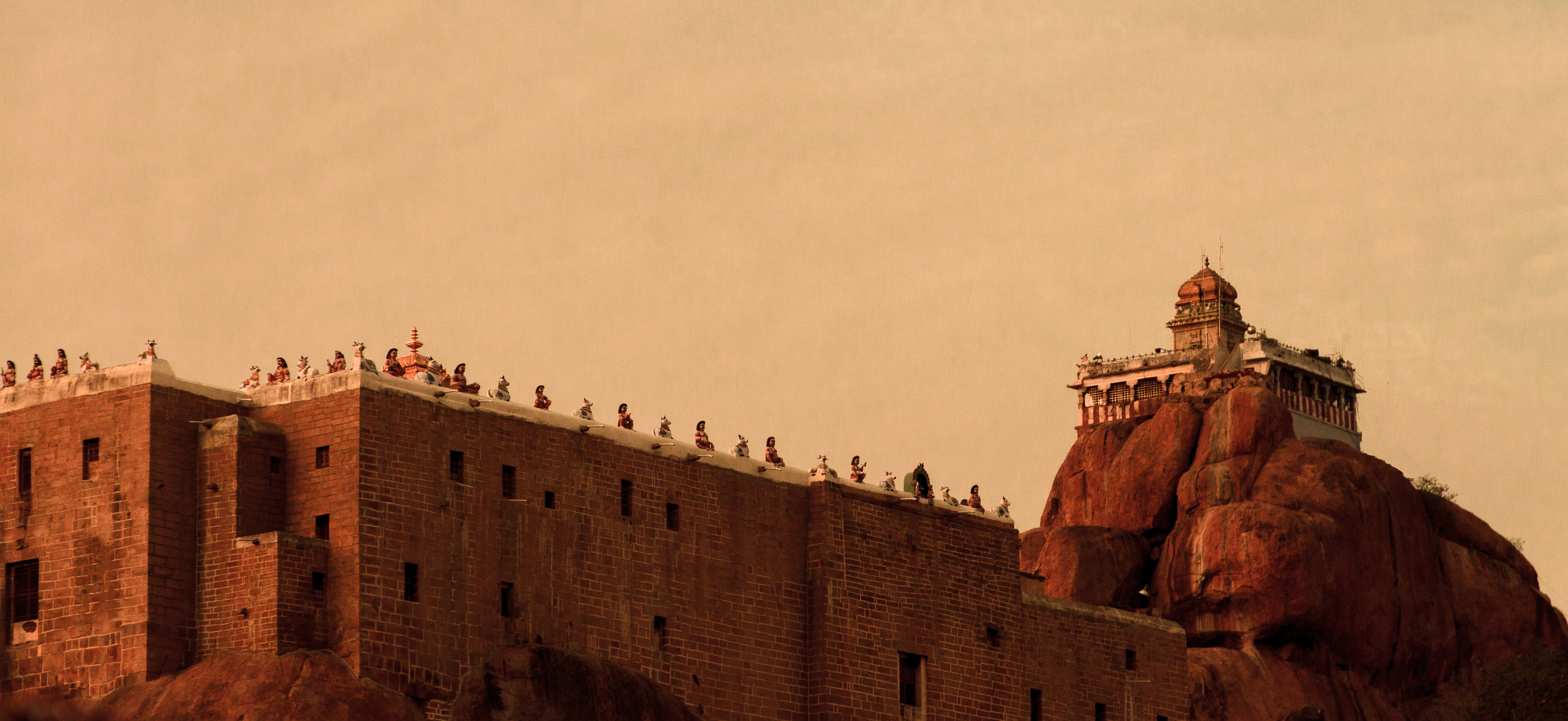
Tiruchirapalli Rock Fort
