= Howrah Planetarium and Astronomical Research Centre =

- হাওড়া তারামণ্ডল ও জ্যোতির্বিজ্ঞান গবেষণা কেন্দ্র
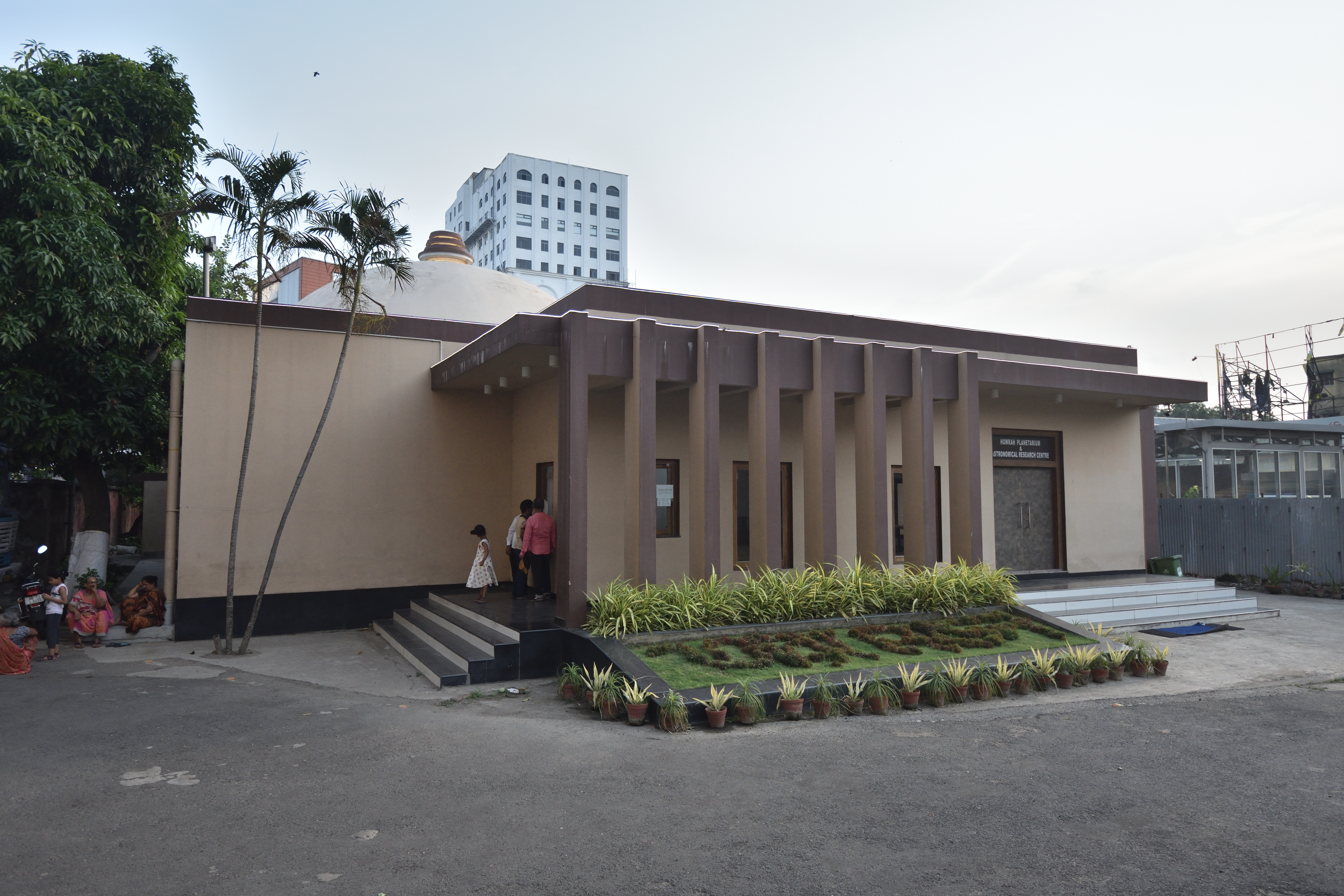
- Established: 2 December 2022; 3 years ago
- Location: Sarat Sadan, Howrah, West Bengal, India
- Coordinates: 22.5822313°N 88.331262°E
- Type: Planetarium museum
- Owner: Howrah Municipal Corporation
- Public transit access: Howrah railway station, Howrah Maidan metro station

Howrah Planetarium and Astronomical Research Centre commonly known as Howrah Planetarium is a planetarium in Howrah, West Bengal, that offers virtual tours of the night sky and cosmic shows in a specially perforated hemispherical dome. It is West Bengal's first 3D planetarium. This '4K' Planetarium is built on screening technology. A total of Rs 14 crores was spent on the construction of the planetarium or Taramandal. The planetarium conducts three shows every afternoon in Bengali, English and Hindi.

== History ==
=== Background ===
Howrah and Kolkata are twin cities. The Hooghly River (a tributary of the Ganges) flows between the two cities, and the two cities are separated from each other by this river course with an average width of 500 meters. But despite the proximity of the two cities, while Kolkata has multiple entertainment options, Howrah is almost deprived. Howrah city does not have any state-of-the-art government theater except Sharat Sadan in Howrah Maidan area and Rabindra Bhavan in Bally, built during the Left regime. They were also dilapidated due to lack of maintenance. After the Trinamool Congress came to power in Howrah municipality in 2015, then mayor Rathin Chakraborty took up the plan to renovate Sarat Sadan. On the other hand, after the merger of Bally Municipality with Howrah, the Municipal Authority also started the renovation of the Rabindra Bhavan.

In 2015, Along with the renovation of Sarat Sadan, a plan was taken up to build another Planetarium technologically superior to the Birla Planetarium in Kolkata.

=== Construction ===
The construction of "Howrah Planetarium and Astronomical Research Centre" was started in 2015 at a cost of Rs 14 crore with some land at Sarat Sadan theater premises.

=== Financial crisis and delay ===
A decision was taken to install a projection device from a specialist firm in France at the Planetarium. But, problems arose in this work, for which the work of planetarium was stopped for a long time. The problem was mainly the financial cost of setting up the instrument and the Term of contract with that company to maintain the planetarium.

Even after 10 months of completion of the work, the Howrah Municipal Corporation failed to pay the contractor. The company's receivable amounts from the Howrah Municipal Corporation were more than Rs.3.50 crores. As a result, the inauguration of planetarium was delayed. planetarium was inaugurated in October 2022, but due to technical problems it could not be opened for visitors.

=== Inauguration ===
The Howrah Planetarium and Astronomical Research Centre was officially inaugurated in October 2022 by the Minister of Public Works and Urban Development, Firhad Hakim. It opened to public on 2 December 2022.

== Description ==
The planetarium is built on Sarat Sadan, Howrah, West Bengal. The dome of the planetarium is 10 meters in diameter and the seating capacity 96 people. The structure was built in collaboration with the Howrah Municipal Corporation and a French company, and the planetarium displays night sky views for visitors through 3D projectors.

== Features ==
A total of 3 shows are conducted a day in this planetarium to introduce visitors to the Solar System. Visitors can also learn about important space discoveries and related information. Each show at planetarium is conducted for 25 minutes. Shows are available here in Bengali, English and Hindi.

== See also ==
- Birla Planetarium, Kolkata
- Astrotourism in India
- List of planetariums
