= Nizhny Novgorod Planetarium =

Planetarium in Nizhny Novgorod, Russia

Coordinates: 56.3185°N 43.9549°E

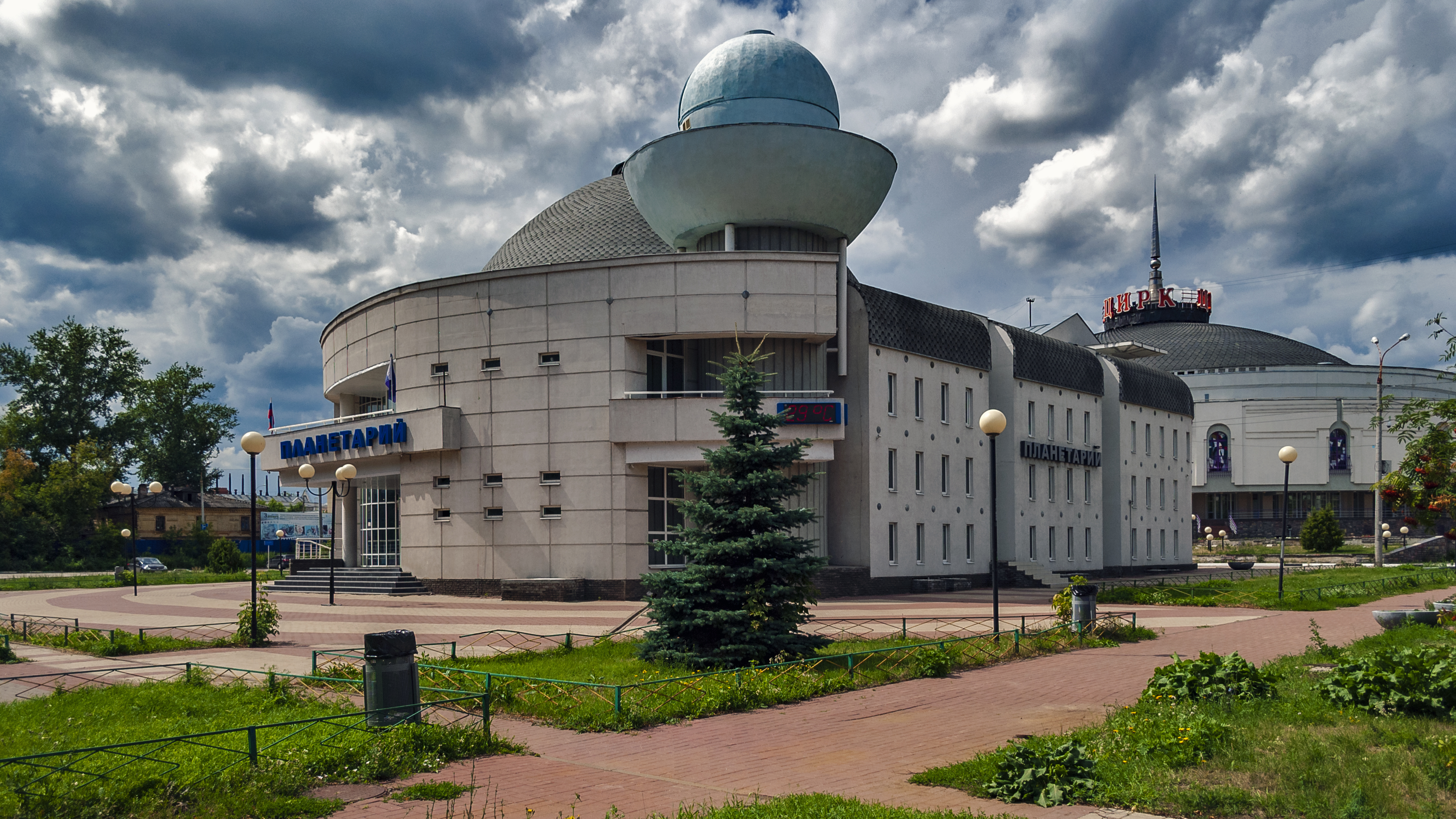
View of the planetarium and circus

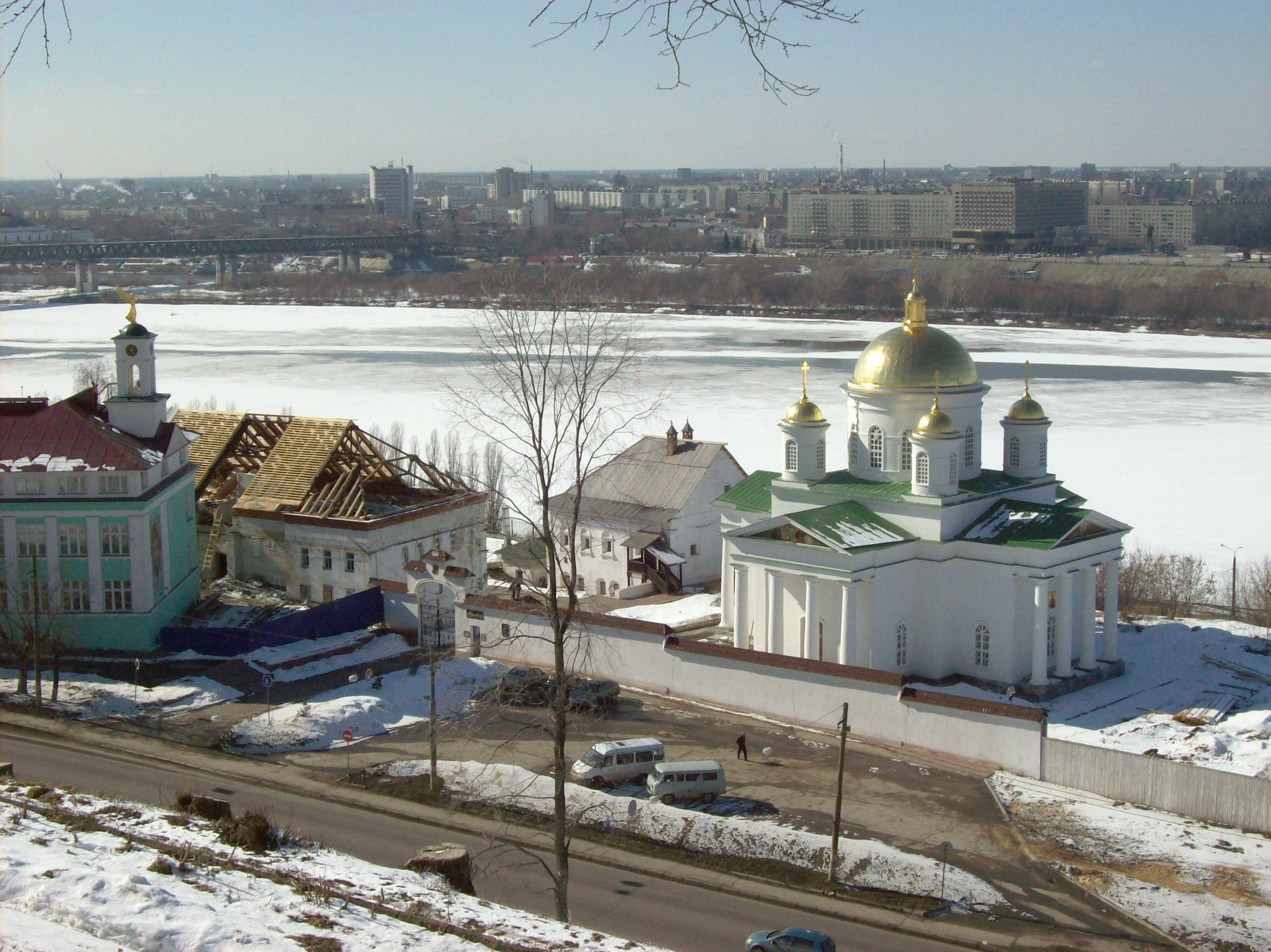
The church that housed the planetarium from 1948-2005

Nizhny Novgorod Planetarium is a planetarium in Nizhny Novgorod, Russia. The planetarium, which was established in 1948, was originally housed at the Annunciation Monastery, where it was operational until December 5, 2005. A modern planetarium was built nearby and opened October 4, 2007, which was timed to coincide with the 50th anniversary of the launch of Sputnik 1, the first artificial satellite sent into space.

== History ==
The planetarium first opened in 1948 as the Gorky Planetarium, the second planetarium in the Soviet Union after the Moscow Planetarium. It was housed in the Alexiev Church at the Annunciation Monastery until 2005, when a modern planetarium building was constructed and the church building was returned to the Russian Orthodox Church.
