= Baghdad Planetarium =

Astronomical Planetarium in Baghdad, Iraq

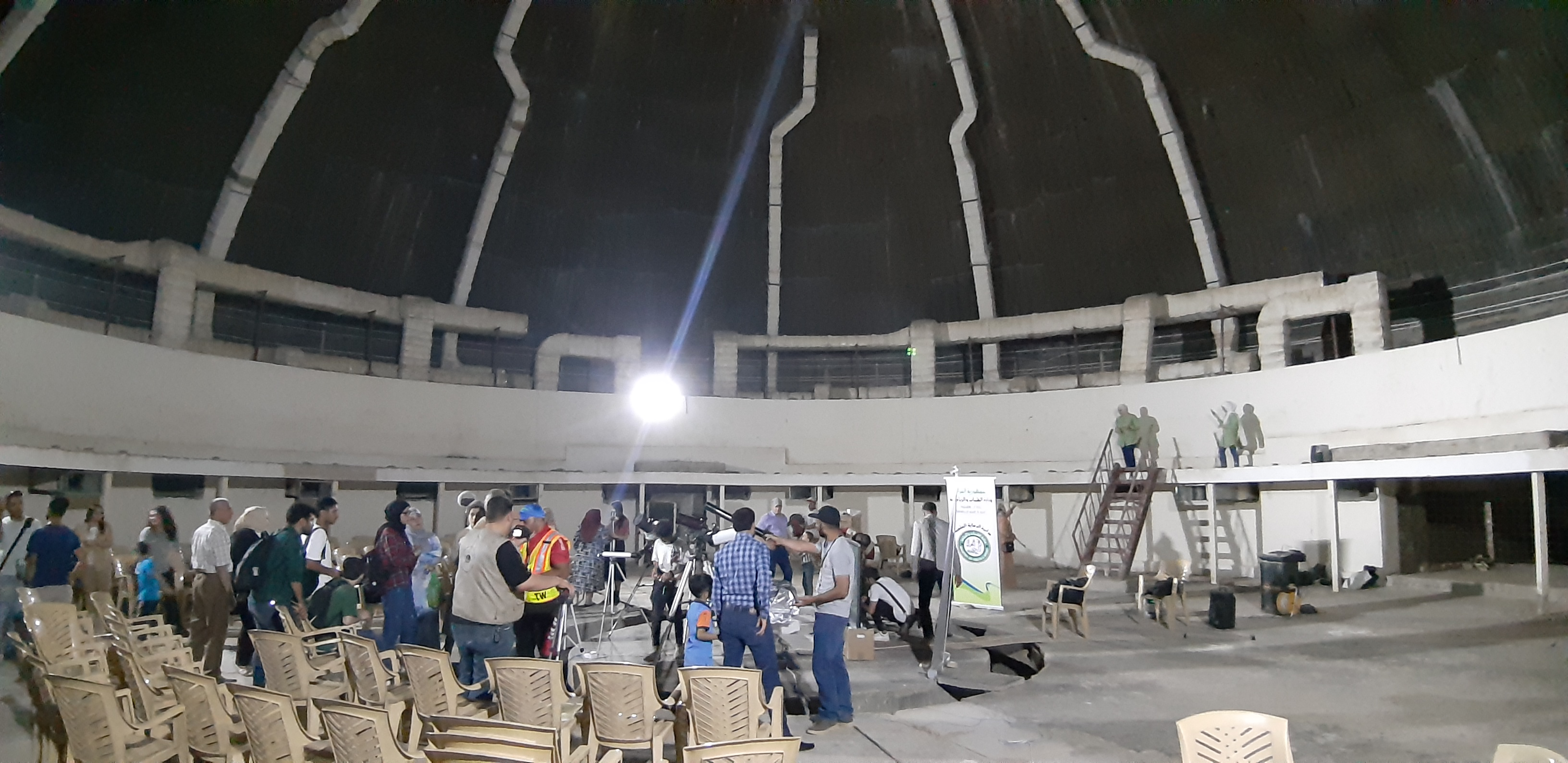
- The Planetarium as of 2022

General information
- Status: Inactive
- Type: Planetarium
- Location: Karkh, Baghdad (Iraq)
- Opened: July 31, 1979

The Baghdad Planetarium (Arabic: القبة الفلكية البغدادي) was a green-domed astronomical Planetarium based in al-Zawra'a Park located diagonally across from the Baghdad Central Railway Station in Baghdad, Iraq.

== Biography ==
=== Historical background ===
Plans to construct a planetarium in Baghdad can be traced back to the Kingdom of Iraq period in which plans for a Greater Baghdad were outlined. Among the people invited for the plans by King Faisal II was American architect and designer Frank Lloyd Wright who designed several cultural buildings as part of the project, one of these was a planetarium next to a civic auditorium located below several vast ramps for east access to the planetarium. The planetarium was supposed to be located on an island alongside an Opera House, a grand Islamic bazaar, and a monument of Abbasid Caliph Harun al-Rashid. However, these plans were never implemented due to the 1958 coup that overthrew the Iraqi monarchy and killed King Faisal II, and lack of interest upon the new Iraqi government established by Abd al-Karim Qasim to continue the project.

=== Establishment ===
The Planetarium was built and opened in 1979 under the leadership of former Iraqi President Saddam Hussein. It is considered one of Iraq's most important scientific and astronomical tributaries, and a landmark of Baghdad in its design, location, and cognitive role. It was the first Planetarium in the Middle East. It became a hotspot for school field trip visits to the planetarium, especially for specialists, and those interested in astronomy, stars, and horoscopes. The building included many astronomical devices and equipment before it was looted and stolen in the events of the first Gulf War in 1991 before it was rehabilitated and became active again. That was until the US Invasion of Iraq in 2003 when it was subjected to the largest vandalism and looting of its laser devices, cameras, and cooling devices that it has seen in its existence. Moreover, the building and its equipment were burned, causing it to close its doors and remain abandoned. Nevertheless, a project to rehabilitate the Planetarium was launched by the Ministry of Youth and Sports in 2011 although no update on the project has been given as of 2023. Despite that, many former visitors of the Planetarium expressed their hope that the dome would be rehabilitated to open its doors again to students and those interested in astronomy.

== See also ==
- Zeiss-Planetarium Jena
- Astronomy in the medieval Islamic world
- Astrolabe
- Astronomical clock
- List of planetariums
