= Guwahati Planetarium =

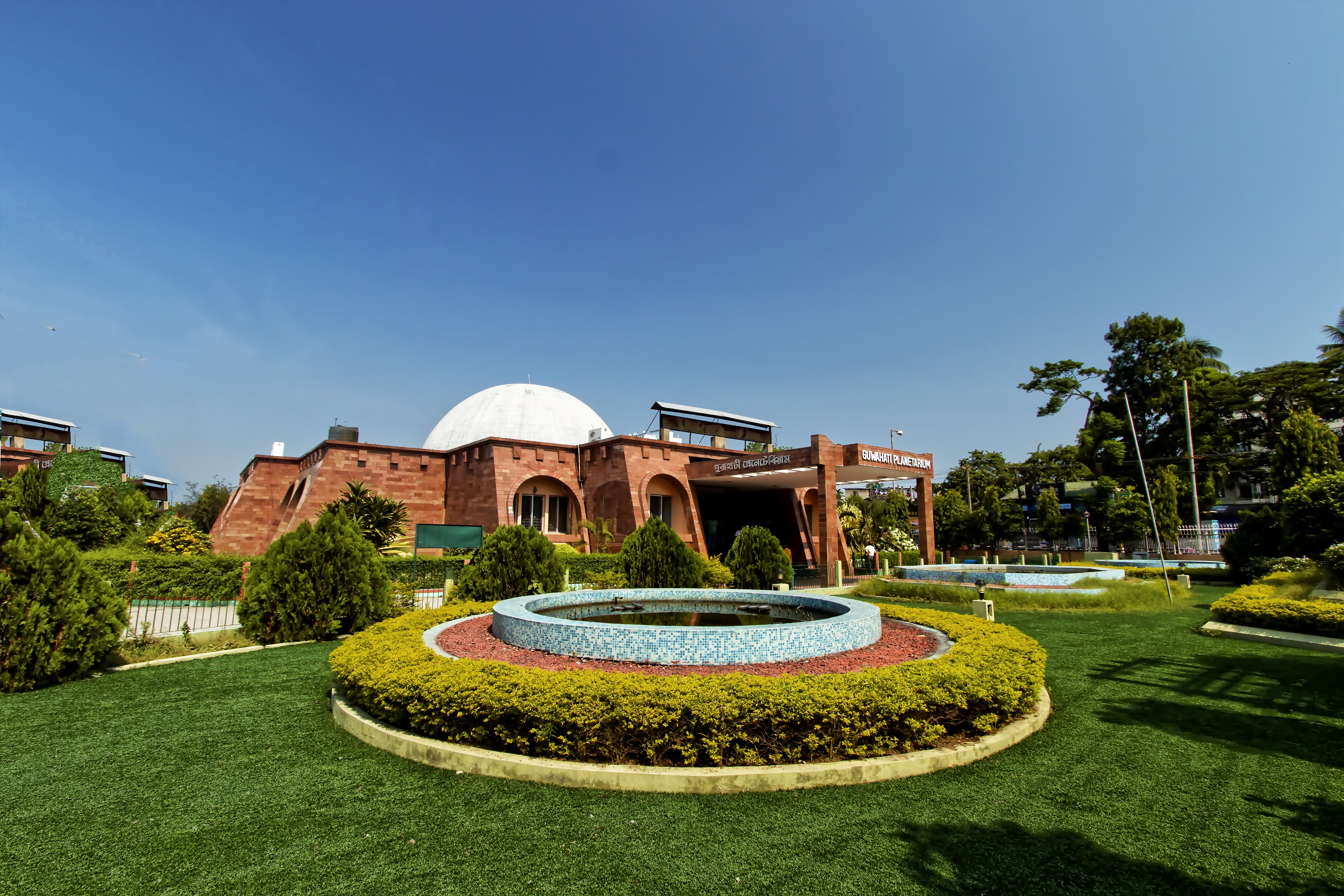
- Established: 1994; 32 years ago
- Location: M.G. Road, Dighalipukhuri, Guwahati
- Type: Planetarium museum and library
- Director: Kimnei Changsan
- Curator: Babul Bora
- Public transit access: State Transport

The Guwahati Planetarium is a center for astronomical education and research. Built in 1994, it is the oldest planetarium in Assam and Northeast India. Its distinctive dome and sloping walls set it apart from the skyline of the area.

The planetarium uses the Chronos star field projector, digital HD video projectors and the Dolby sky theater's sound system to put on shows of the night sky in the theater. These shows are projected onto the interior of the dome and are available in both Assamese and English. The shows are one of the main attractions of the planetarium. Night sky watching sessions are also popular among visitors.

The Guwahati Planetarium is an attempt to reach the young and scientifically inclined minds and provide them a glimpse of the night sky and solar system.

Besides daily shows, the Planetarium also regularly organizes seminars, workshops and conferences for scientists and researchers. It also offers exhibitions, quizzes, and outdoor viewing facilities during eclipses for students and the local community.

The Planetarium has a unique hybrid planetarium projection system, the first one of its kind in the entire northeast region. It is the second planetarium in India to get such a system, the first one being New Delhi Planetarium.

Apart from the projection system, an astronomical gallery is likely going to be launched by the Creative Museum Designers (CMD) at the planetarium. The state science and technology department has already released funds for the upcoming project. A library is included in the facilities.

== See also ==
- Astrotourism in India
- List of planetariums
- Swami Vivekananda Planetarium, Mangalore
