= Vir Bahadur Singh Planetarium, Gorakhpur =

Tourist attraction in Uttar Pradesh, India

Coordinates: 26.7276°N 83.3881°E

Vir Bahadur Singh Planetarium (also spelled 'Veer' or 'Bir') is a tourist attraction in Gorakhpur, Uttar Pradesh, India. It has been run by the Council of Science & Technology, Uttar Pradesh since 21 December 2009.

This planetarium runs three daily, 45-minute shows at 1pm, 3pm and 5pm. It has a dome size of 18m and a seating capacity of 395. It is based on digital technology, and six equipments of CRT, Evans and Sutherland are installed here.

== See also ==
- Astrotourism in India
- List of planetariums

== See also ==
- List of planetariums
