= Kusumbai Motichand Planetarium =

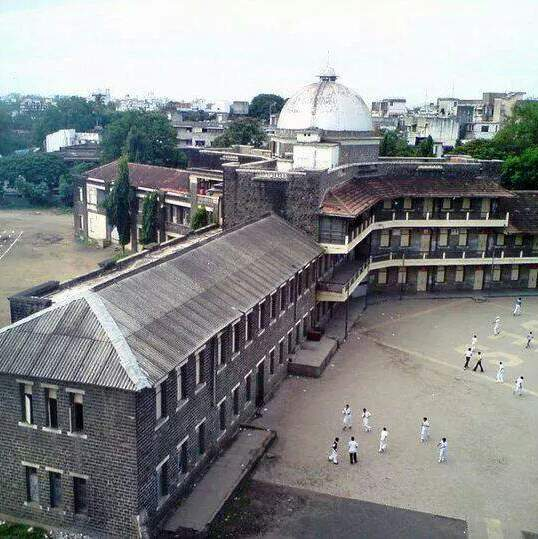
- Planetarium is located on the top of the central hub of New English School, Tilak Road

General information
- Type: School, Planetarium
- Address: 485, Sadashiv Peth, Pune, Maharashtra, India
- Town or city: Pune, Maharashtra
- Country: India
- Coordinates: 18°30′39″N 73°50′41″E

Kusumbai Motichand Planetarium, the first projection planetarium in Asia, became operational at the New English School in Pune on 18 September 1954. It was named after the mother of Seth Motichand Shah, son-in-law of Seth Walchand Hirachand(1882–1953), the founder of the Walchand group of Industries. The venture of a planetarium building was possible because of the generous donation of Rs.50000 from Walchand Group in the early 1950s.

The planetarium movement in India had started with the opening of a simple planetarium in the New English School in Pune in 1954. The New English School building has a unique Y-shaped architecture with three linear wings that are connected to the central hub at 120-degree angle. The topmost point of the hub, a concrete hemispherical dome of about 9 metres (30 ft) inner diameter is a Kusumbai Motichand Planetarium. The floor area of the planetarium is 63 square meters. The planetarium can accommodate 100 people at a time.

The planetarium was inaugurated by Girija Shankar Bajpai, the then Governor of Bombay Province.

== History of Planetarium Projector ==
The idea of developing a device which can simulate planetary motions against the background of artificially created night sky dates back to 1913. Max Wolf, a German scientist and astronomer had suggested this idea to Oskar von Miller, another German engineer and also the founder President of the Deutsches Museum in Munich. Planetarium Jena, the oldest continuously operating planetarium in the world used this idea of projector for the first time in 1926.

After the first modern planetarium, for the next twenty years many planetariums were established in Europe, Japan and America, however not in India.

During the late 1930s, Armand Spitz, a part-time lecturer at The Fels Planetarium of the Franklin Institute in Philadelphia, had started developing his own projector for the planetarium. However, while designing an inexpensive planetarium projector, Spitz realized the difficulties involving the icosahedron shaped projector globe. He approached Albert Einstein for a solution. Following Einstein's suggestion, Spitz used a dodecahedron and managed to produce an inexpensive planetarium projector. This planetarium is believed to be the only planetarium in the world that is running its shows with this projector for more than sixty years.

== Suspension and later resumption of operation ==
The projector installed in Kusumbai Motichand Planetarium is Spitz A1 instrument imported from Philadelphia. It is the oldest planetarium instrument in India that was still operational. Since 2004, the projector remained out of order resulting suspension of planetarium shows.

However, efforts were made to revive the planetarium in 2012 by the staff of New English School, by replacing some defective components such as transformer, mercury switches, projector motor, electrical bulbs, etc. Along with the repairs, some modifications were also made to the projection system to show zodiacs in the planetarium. After seven years of non-operation, the planetarium was reopened for the general public on the occasion of National Science Day on 28 February 2012.

It is believed to be the oldest functional school planetarium in Asia.

== See also ==
- Astrotourism in India
- Swami Vivekananda Planetarium, Mangalore
- List of planetariums
