= Ghana Planetarium =

Planetarium in Accra, Ghana

Coordinates: 5.57559°N 0.18595°W

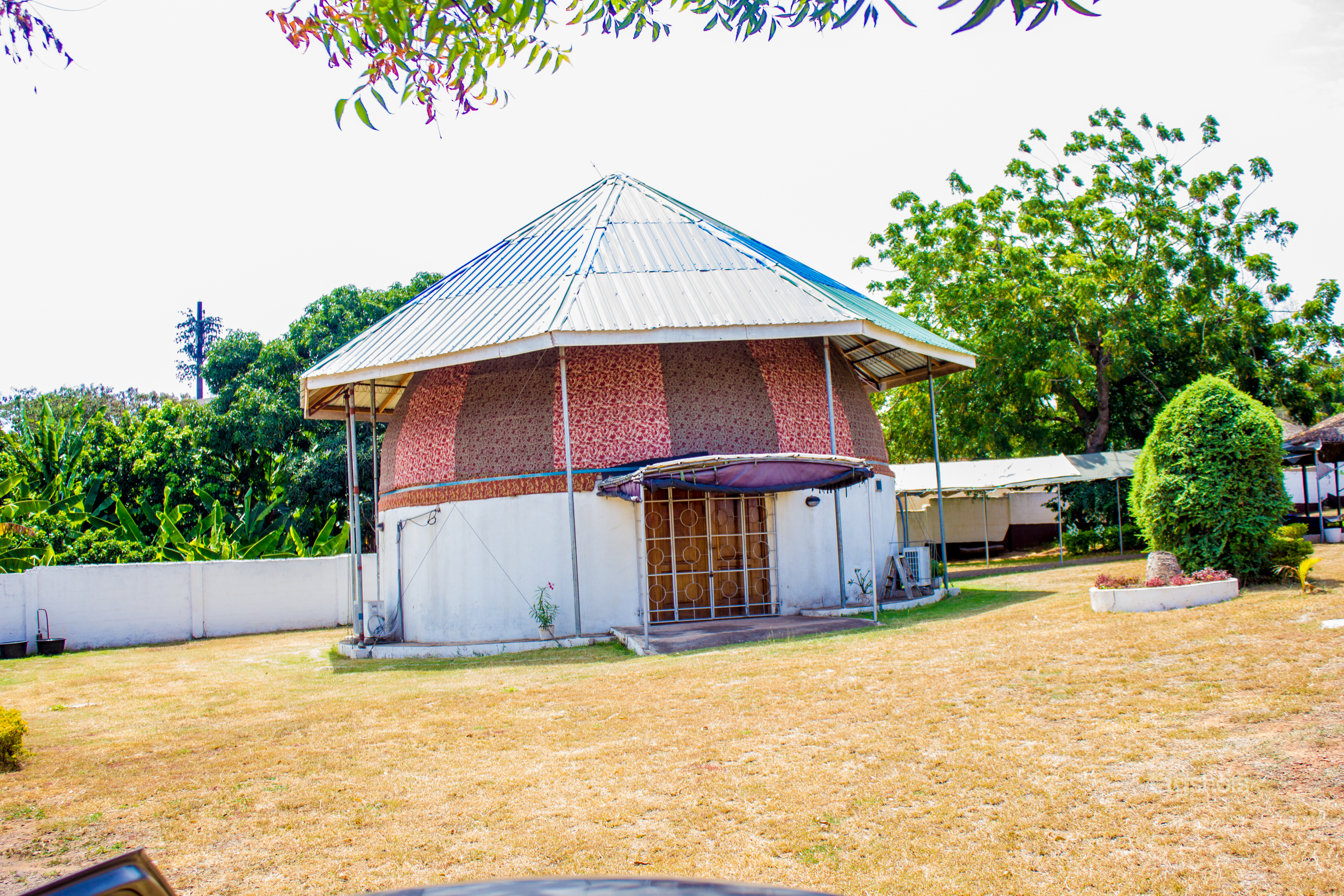
The Ghana Planetarium

The Ghana Planetarium was located behind the Ghana Police Headquarters in Cantonments, Accra. It was open throughout the year.

The planetarium of Accra was founded by Dr. Jacob and Jane Ashong and was constructed from their pension in 2009. It was officially opened on Thursday January 22, 2009 by the British High Commissioner, Nicholas Westcott. Also attending were The British Council Director, The French Ambassador and the Chief of Nungua and his entourage.

In February 2023, the planetarium had to close to the public, due to a change in land ownership. Shortly after, the staff posted an update that they were working on finding a new location. In the meantime, they have plans to develop a "travelling planetarium."
