= Parque Astronómico la Punta =

The Parque Astronómico La Punta is an astronomical park which is part of the Universidad de La Punta, in Argentina. It aims to teach the fundamentals of observational astronomy and improve knowledge in the natural sciences.

== History ==
The Parque Astronómico La Punta was created in 2006 as an outreach project. Today it has an observatory, a planetarium and the exhibit "El Solar de las Miradas".

It also has some interactive science exhibits and modular under the concept of "please touch".

The PALP edited the book "El solar de las Miradas" with the history of the park's creation.
