= Yokohama Science Center =

Science museum in Yokohama, Japan

Coordinates: 35.377064°N 139.594914°E

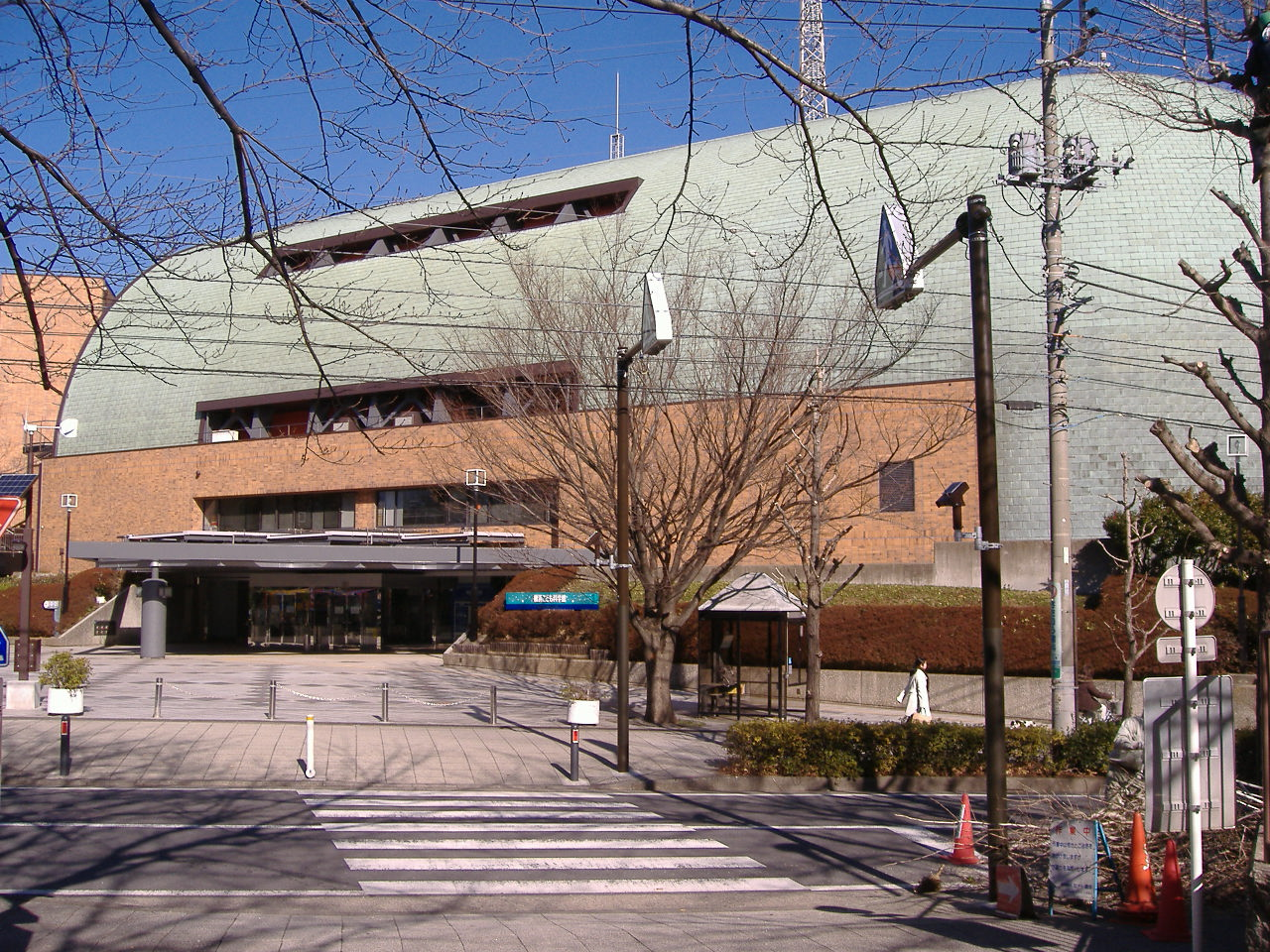
Exterior of Yokohama Science Center

Yokohama Science Center (横浜こども科学館, Yokohama Kodomo Kagakukan) is a science museum in Isogo-ku, Yokohama, Kanagawa, Japan.

The museum is called Hamagin Space Science Center (はまぎんこども宇宙科学館, Hamagin Kodomo Uchū Kagakukan) under the sponsorship of the Bank of Yokohama.
