= PAGASA Planetarium =

Planetarium in Quezon City, Philippines

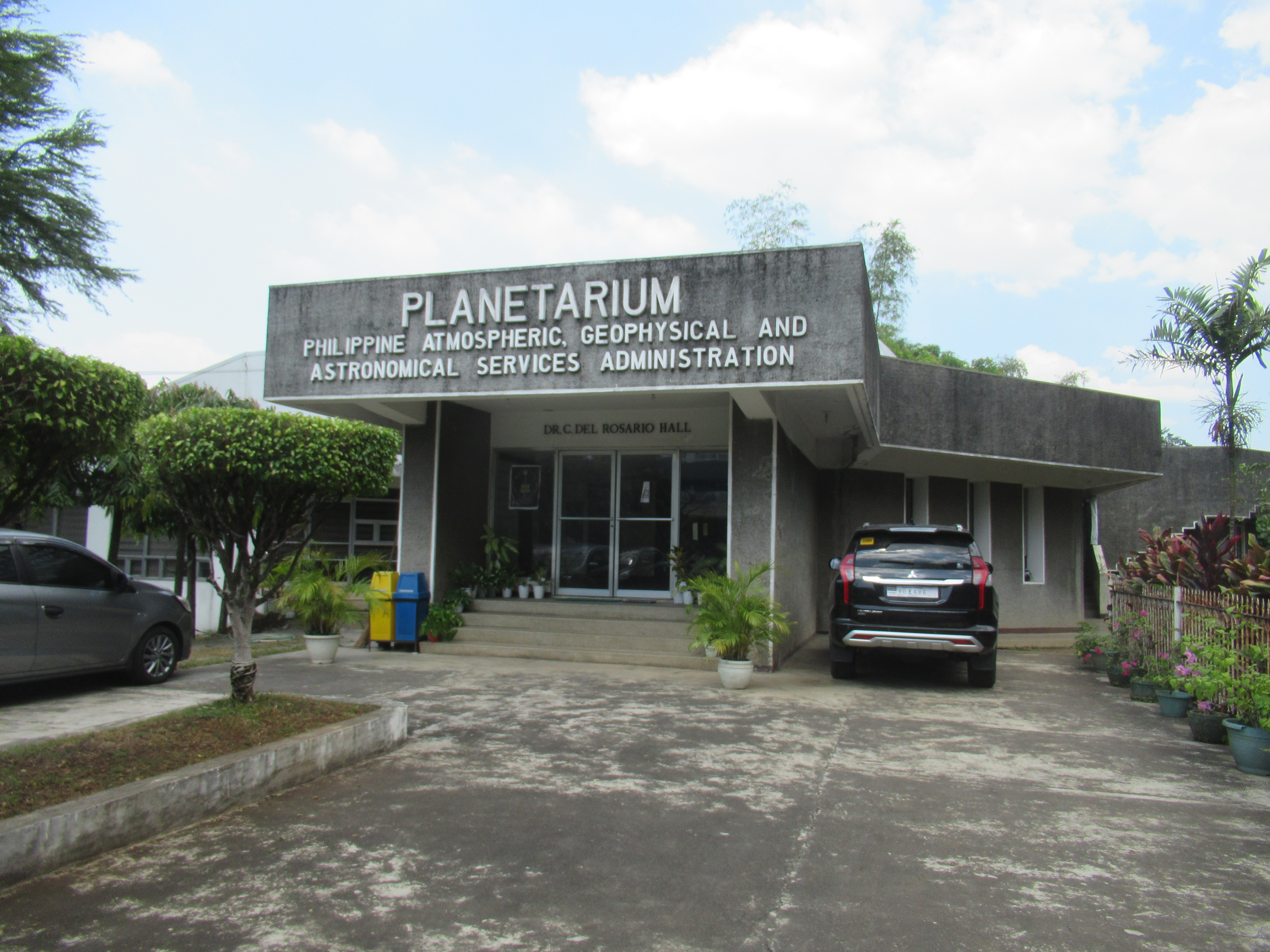
- Coordinates: 14°38′41″N 121°02′36″E
- Type: Planetarium
- Owner: Philippine Atmospheric, Geophysical and Astronomical Services Administration
- Building details
- Location in Metro Manila Location in Luzon Location in the Philippines

General information
- Status: Completed
- Location: PAGASA Science Garden, Agham Road, Quezon City, Philippines
- Inaugurated: September 1977

The PAGASA Planetarium is a planetarium within the grounds of the PAGASA Science Garden situated along Agham Road in Quezon City, Metro Manila, Philippines. It is operated and owned by the Philippine Atmospheric, Geophysical and Astronomical Services Administration (PAGASA).

The planetarium was built in September 1977. The facility is managed by PAGASA's Astronomy Research and Development Section (AsRDS) and Atmospheric, Geophysical and Space Sciences Branch (AGSSB). The planetarium has a maximum capacity of 100 people.

In 1999, the AsRDS acquired a mobile planetarium which can be transported to areas outside Manila upon request. The mobile planetarium has a maximum capacity of 50 people.

Minor renovations were done in 2005, which included the replacement of chairs which were in poor condition.

Major renovations were done in 2024. The 90-seater planetarium under Administrator Nathaniel Servando showcases arrays of posters and astronomical images, like the sun's life cycle, supernovas, and astronomical seasons. It also hosts educational shows and lectures, including the National Astronomy Week and 100 Hours of Astronomy.

== See also ==
- National Planetarium (Manila)
