= Planetarium of Nantes =

French planetarium

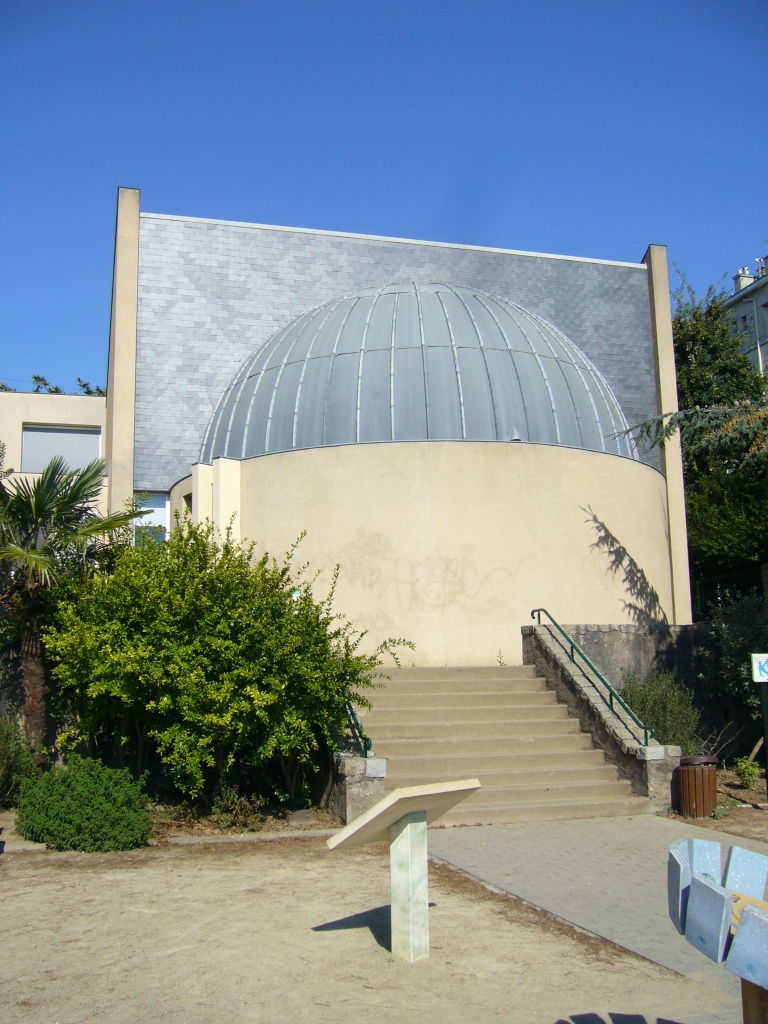
- South facade of Nantes Planetarium seen from Square Moisan
- Established: June 18, 1981
- Location: Nantes, France
- Coordinates: 47.202221°N 1.577458°W
- Type: Planetarium
- Visitors: 25,000 (2012) 50,000 (2018)
- Website: https://planetariumnantes.wixsite.com

The Nantes Planetarium is a public planetarium that opened on 18 June 1981. It operates as an auditorium that presents astronomy shows for all audiences.

== History ==
In 1978, the Jules Verne Museum opened its doors in the quartier of Butte Sainte Anne. During the exhibition dedicated to the 150th anniversary of Jules Verne's birth at the Palais de la Bourse, a Zeiss planetarium was on display. The following year, the city of Nantes decided to acquire its own planetarium. At that time, only one large planetarium existed in France: a 23.5-meter one in Paris (at the Palais de la Découverte). The Planetarium of Nantes would open its doors to the public on 18 June 1981 and was equipped with a Zeiss ZKP2 projector.

Between 1999 and 2000, the City of Nantes enlarged the premises with two 9m2 offices, enabling the reception area to be enlarged and a number of models and meteorite collections to be installed. In the autumn of 2005, 25 years after its installation and at the cost of around 480,000 euros, the Zeiss opto-mechanical projector was replaced by a digital system. The City of Nantes donated its old Zeiss projector to the National University of Cordoba in Argentina, which was then able to open its own planetarium 2017. At that time, only three major planetariums in France were equipped with digital technology: the Digistar II, the Evans & Sutherland fisheye (Vaulx-en-Velin, Pleumeur-Bodou and Toulouse), and Saint-Étienne was experimenting with multi-video projectors. The Planetarium of Nantes became the first in the world to install five video projectors (covering the entire vault) DLP type in a medium-sized dome.

Since the 1990s, some pioneers have been developing digital installations to replace opto-mechanical star projectors. Digital installations consist of installing video projectors in the dome, computers and software (astronomical simulator) to reconstruct the observable Universe data astronomical catalogs constructed by data from astrometric satellites, such as Hipparcos (about 120,000 positioned stars) or Gaia (spacecraft) (more than 1 million objects). This made it possible to move in three dimensions, in real time or to "travel" in time. If the simulator is well built, it can also travel from planets to planets and land there.

In the fall of 2013, the Nantes Planetarium closed for refurbishment work: change of video projectors, computers, and software for around 500,000 euros. During the two months of closure to the public, the chairs were refreshed, the painting of the dome was redone, and the public lobby was rearranged.

As a result of the transformation of the urban community into Metropole, it became a metropolitan facility between January 2015 and January 2016.

=== Covid-19 ===
Prior to the outbreak of the COVID-19, renovations had been planned for Autumn of 2020, however, these did not proceed. Instead, the Planetarium remained closed for 16 months. The Planetarium reopened for its 40th anniversary on July 3, 2021.Following the reopening, renovations went ahead and consisted of changing the carpet, a renewing paintings, upgrading the seating arrangements, relocating the console beyond the room's periphery to accommodate eight additional seats, and installing a new airlock to facilitate a discreet exit without undue illumination upon transition from darkness. This was additionally accompanied by a renovation of the air conditioning system.

== Characteristics ==
Built under an 8-meter-diameter dome, the planetarium can accommodate 59 spectators per visit and welcomes around up to 60,000 visitors a year. In the reception hall, there are three large meteorites (the heaviest weighing 36kg) which the public may touch. Fragments of various types of meteorites are on display. Models recreate the scenes of robots on the soil of Mars, Venus, the Moon, and Titan (moon). The Planetarium of Nantes also collaborates with other research institutions, such as the Laboratory of Planetology at the University of Nantes and the Museum of Natural History.

== Square Marcel-Moisan ==
This small municipal square of 690 m^{2} (7,400 sq ft), located between the back of the planetarium and Hermitage Street, has in its centre a set of sculptures, including a giant sundial, made by Jean-Michel Ansel, sundial maker, titled Structures astronomiques, representing the movement of the Earth around the Sun, solar and lunar eclipses, the retrograde movement of Mars, daylight on Earth in real time, the planets scaled to each other, etc. This square is accessible either by the staircase located between Misery Street and Hermitage Street, or from the Acadians Street bypassing the planetarium.
