= Penza Planetarium =

Planetarium in Penza, Russia

Coordinates: 53.1870°N 45.0020°E

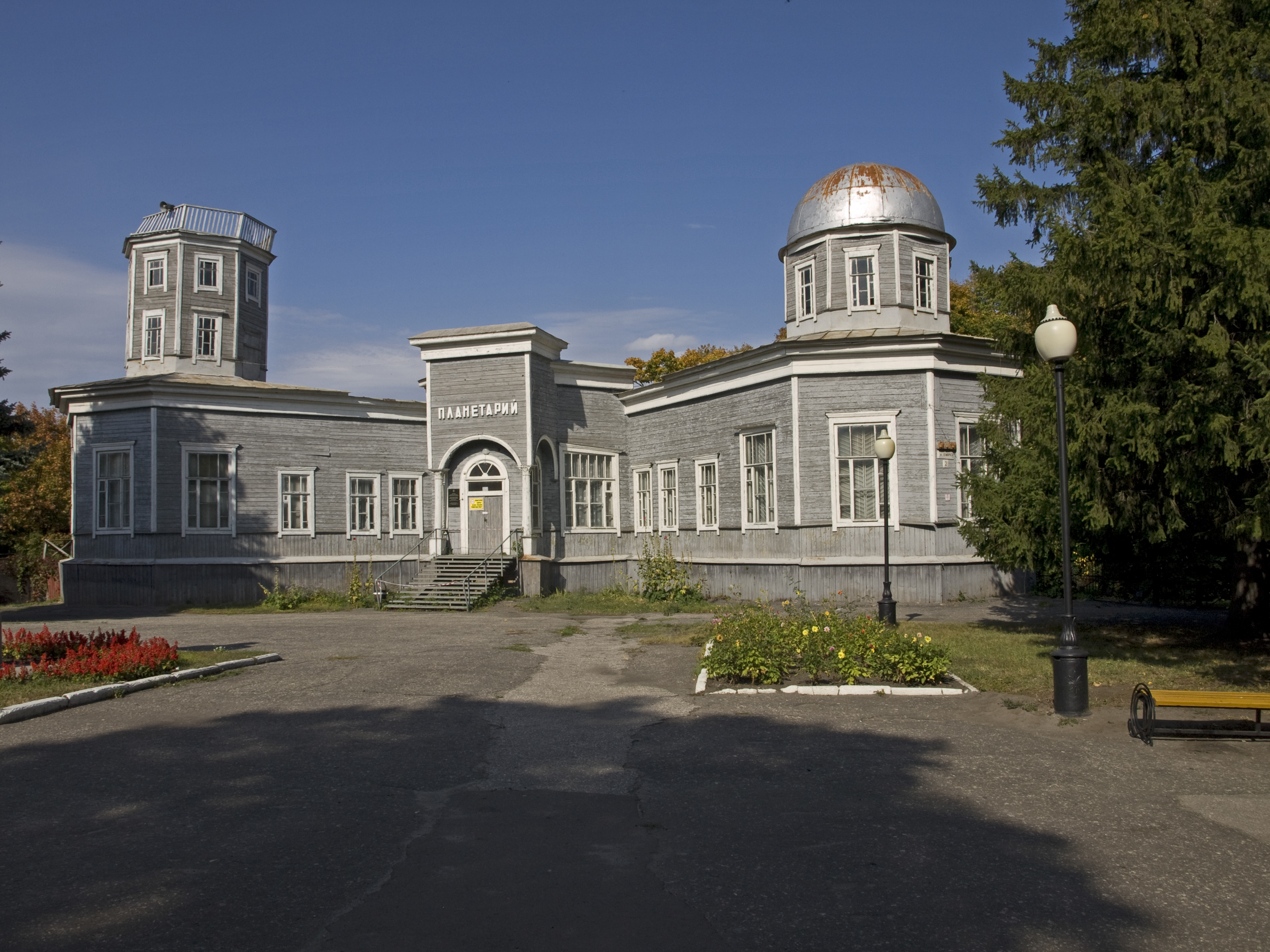
Planetarium in 2016

Penza planetarium is located at Penza Central Park of Culture and Recreation named after V. Belinsky in the building formerly occupied by the Penza Hydrometeorological station. Historical and cultural memorial of local importance. The first planetarium device was installed in 1954.

After the condition of the building was declared unsafe, the planetarium was closed down for public visits in 2011. The original building was subsequently demolished in 2021, despite the local government's earlier promises to save and restore it. A new planetarium was built in its place, which opened for the public in 2023.

== History ==
Astronomy and meteorology research in Penza was started in 1855 when Ilya Ulyanov, physics and mathematics teacher of Penza noble institution, started to conduct systematic observations of the Earth atmosphere at the request of the Kazan University rector Nikolai Lobachevsky.

In 1928, the People's Observatory was built at the park as a memorial to Ilya Ulyanov. Now the wooden building of observatory is a historical and cultural monument of local importance.

=== Creating planetarium ===
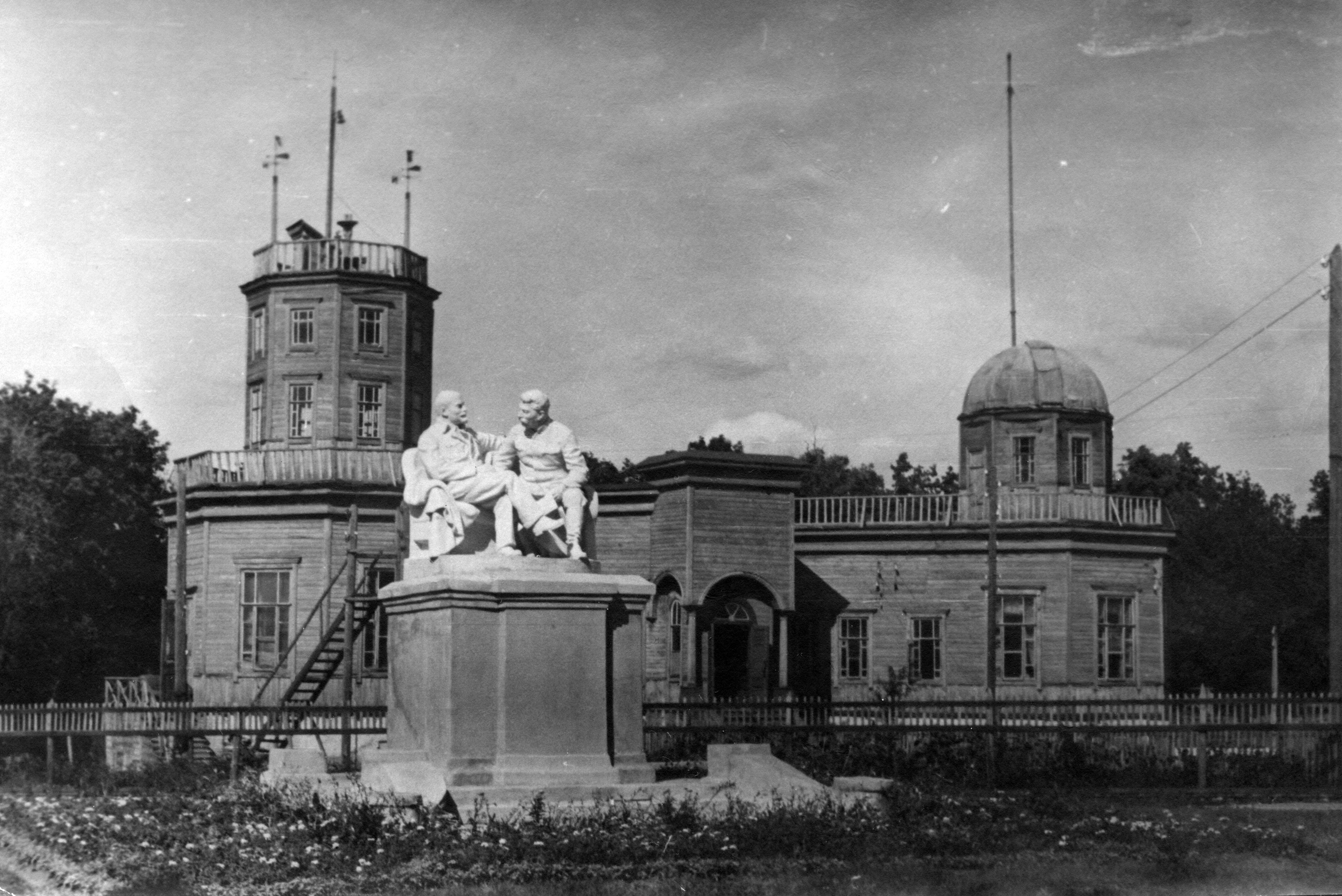
The observatory with planetarium in 1956

The first unit for Planetarium was established in 1954. In 1975, a better German machine "Small Zeiss" was installed to demonstrate a star sky at any time.

Penza Planetarium has a rich methodological base and a set of exhibits, demonstrated at the five halls of the museum. The original meteorites, Ulugh Beg's Quadrant, Foucault pendulum can be seen at the exhibition . The models of first artificial satellite of the Earth and orbital stations "Salyut 1" and "Mir» are in the Space Hall .

=== Reconstruction ===
From 2021 to 2023, the replica of the wooden building was constructed within the framework of the national project "Culture". A complex of construction and finishing works was carried out, the features of the building, which are of historical and cultural value, allegedly remained unchanged. On September 2, 2023, the opening took place.
