= Planétarium de Reims =

Planetarium of Reims
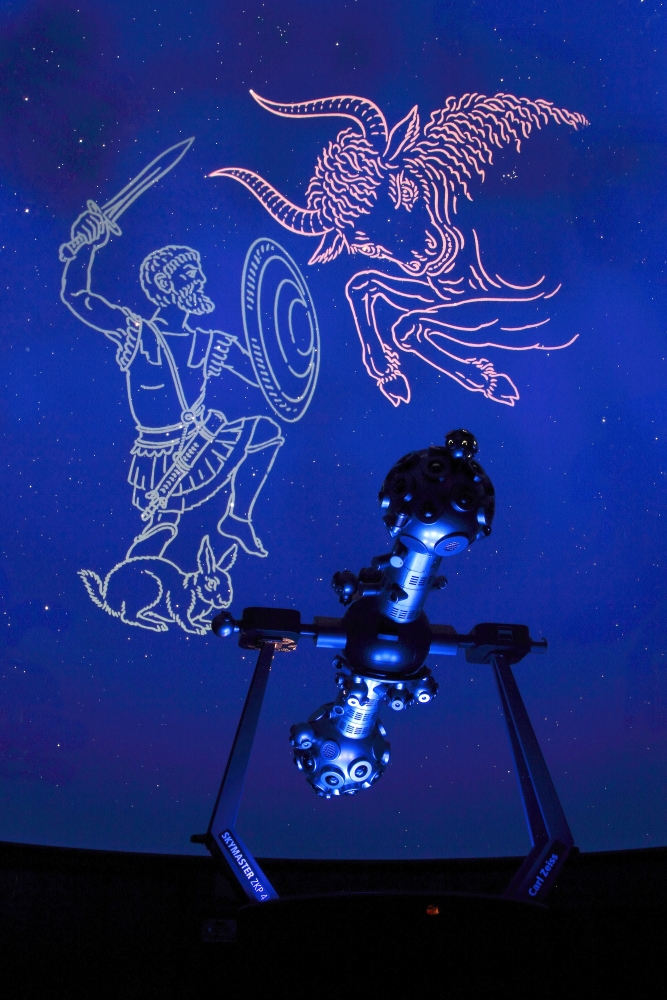
- Display of the constellations Orion and Taurus
- Established: 1979
- Location: Reims, France
- Coordinates: 49.242847°N 4.015628°E
- Type: Planetarium

The Planetarium of Reims is the second oldest planetarium in France.

== History ==
The Reims planetarium is a place for the dissemination of scientific culture, and more particularly of astronomy to schoolchildren and the general public. The projection system allows you to observe the movements of the Moon, planets and stars, and learn to recognize the constellations.

The first planetarium was installed on Place Museux in the historic setting of the Old Jesuit College, an architectural ensemble from the 17th century, where it operated from March 1, 1980 to January 6, 2013. The room measured 6 meters in diameter, with a capacity of 40 seats. It was equipped with a Zeiss ZKP2 astronomical projector. Over time, the projector was supplemented with a multimedia device (slide projectors, computers, video projectors, special effects projectors) in order to make the sessions more lively and to allow the facilitators to have more teaching aids ( pictures, videos). The average annual attendance was 26,000 visitors (school and general public). In 2003, it celebrated its 500,000th visitor.

The new planetarium was opened to the public on September 7, 2013, after 18 months of work at a cost of 3.4 million euros, in new premises, located at 49, rue du Général-de-Gaulle, in Reims. The elliptical-shaped building is by the architect Jean-Paul Bonnemaisson. The building is treated as an autonomous object, like a solitary star reflecting, moreover in the image of the machines leaving to explore space; connection by footbridges which brings visitors like astronauts boarding a rocket, installation on stilts, shine of the skin made of glass scales like the heat shield of space shuttles. The cylinder under the building received a varnished okoumé skin. At night, all of this glass skin is the support for the staging of some of the 88 constellations and their movements, by setting up a grid of light points based on Leeds.

The new air-conditioned dome measures 8 meters in diameter for a capacity of 48 very comfortable seats plus two places for people with reduced mobility. It is equipped with a Zeiss ZKP4 astronomical projector with optical fibers (cost €450,000), and a multimedia system comprising three high-definition DLP projectors. The projection room is complemented by a scenographic space of nearly 200 m2. The planetarium database allows you to place the sky at a specific moment in history, such as the position of the stars during the French Revolution in 1789.
