= Anna Science Centre, Tiruchirappalli =

Anna Science Centre
- Established: 10 June 1999
- Location: Pudukottai Road Road, Kottapattu, Tiruchirappalli, India.
- Coordinates: 10.768859°N 78.703144°E
- Type: Planetarium
- Website: http://tnstc.gov.in/anna-science-centre.html

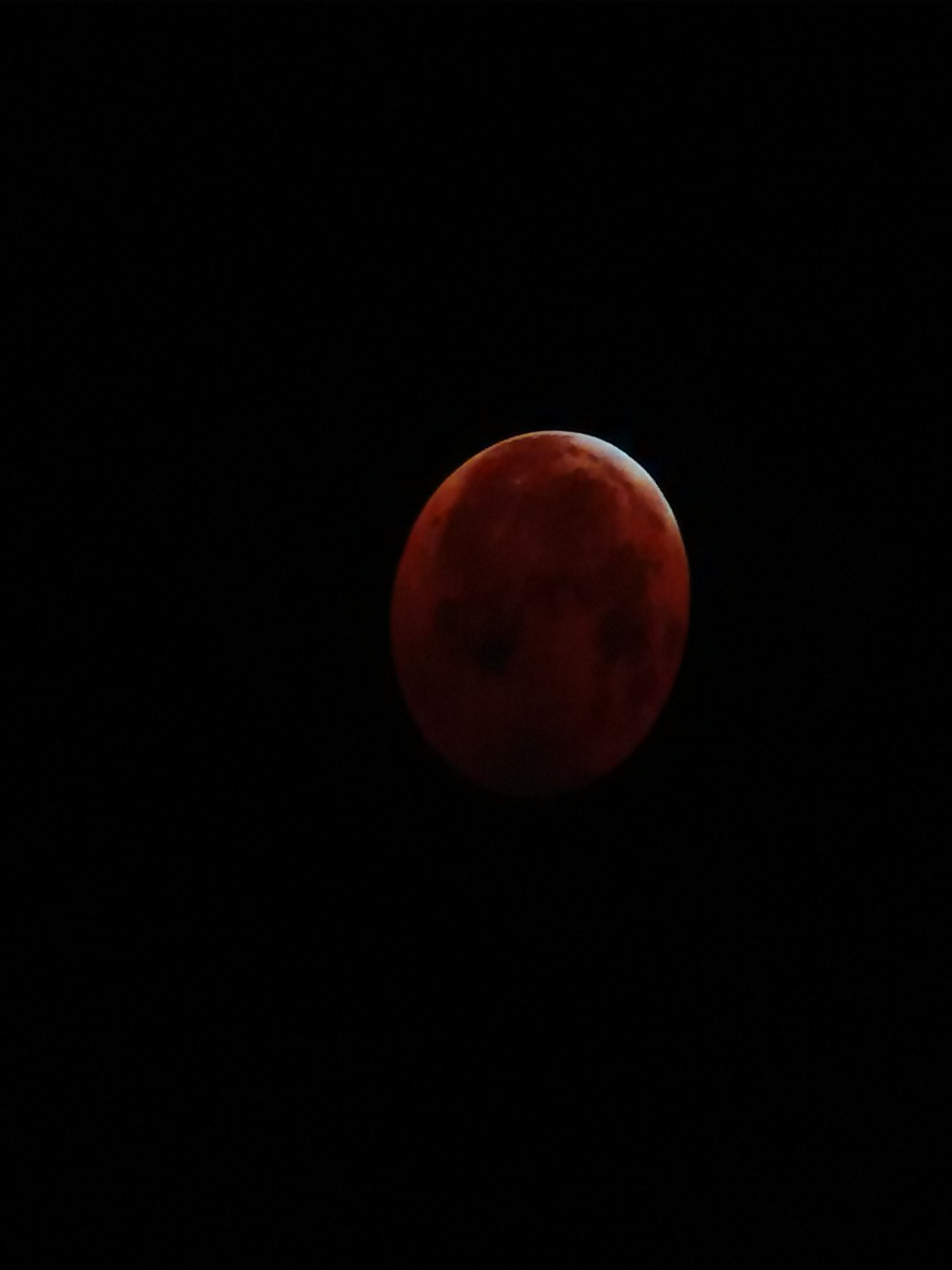
Moon shown in planetarium dome

Anna Science Centre is established for the cause of educating young generation and general public on the objectives of Tamil Nadu Science and Technology Centre. The centre hosts Science and Technology Halls with various exhibitions and also a planetarium.

== Location ==
It is located in the Indian city of Tiruchirappalli, on the National Highway 210 between Trichy and Pudukottai adjacent to the Tiruchirapalli Airport. The Nearest Railway Station is Tiruchirappalli Junction located in 5 km. The Planetarium is well connected through City buses.

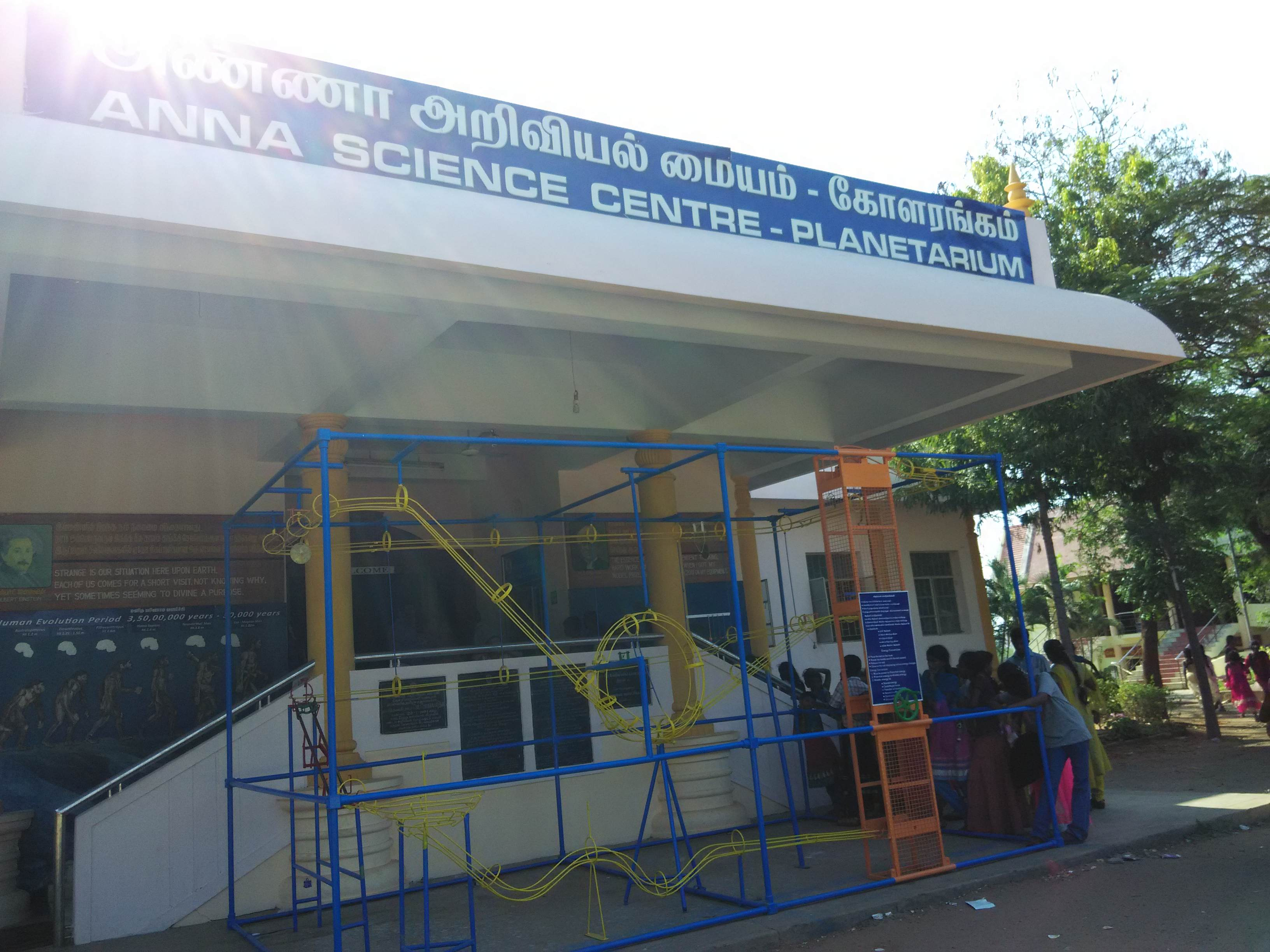
Main entrance

== History ==
The Anna Science Centre, Tiruchirappalli was established by the Government of Tamil Nadu and was inaugurated on 10 June 1999. School and college-going students from neighbouring districts such as Pudukkottai, Thanjavur, Perambalur, Dindigul, Karur and Madurai are promoted to visit the planetarium.

== Features ==
The various facilities present in the Science centre are

- A 75-seater planetarium
- A 3D theatre to host 3D films like Shark Island, Magic Show, Roller Coaster etc.
- An environment gallery which exhibits themes related to eco systems, bio-geochemical cycles, bio-diversity and conservation. There is also Vigyan Prasar, an EDUSAT Facility and Try Science – Around the World, a system that has details about the science centres in more than 50 countries.
- An Evolution Park showcasing models to demonstrate the evolution of species is present at the centre spread for 2 Acres.
- An Innovation Hub is under construction at the cost of 2.25 cr which will have infrastructure to host workshops in the field of scientific experimentation for school students.

== Shows ==
The Science Centre hosts frequent sky watch programs where general public can take part to view the celestial objects through telescope for free. Such programs are also conducted during important space events like eclipse. The planetarium has shows in both Tamil and English. Tamil shows will be at 10.30 am, 1.00 pm, 3.30 PM and 4.45 pm. In English shows will be at 11.45 am and 2.15 pm

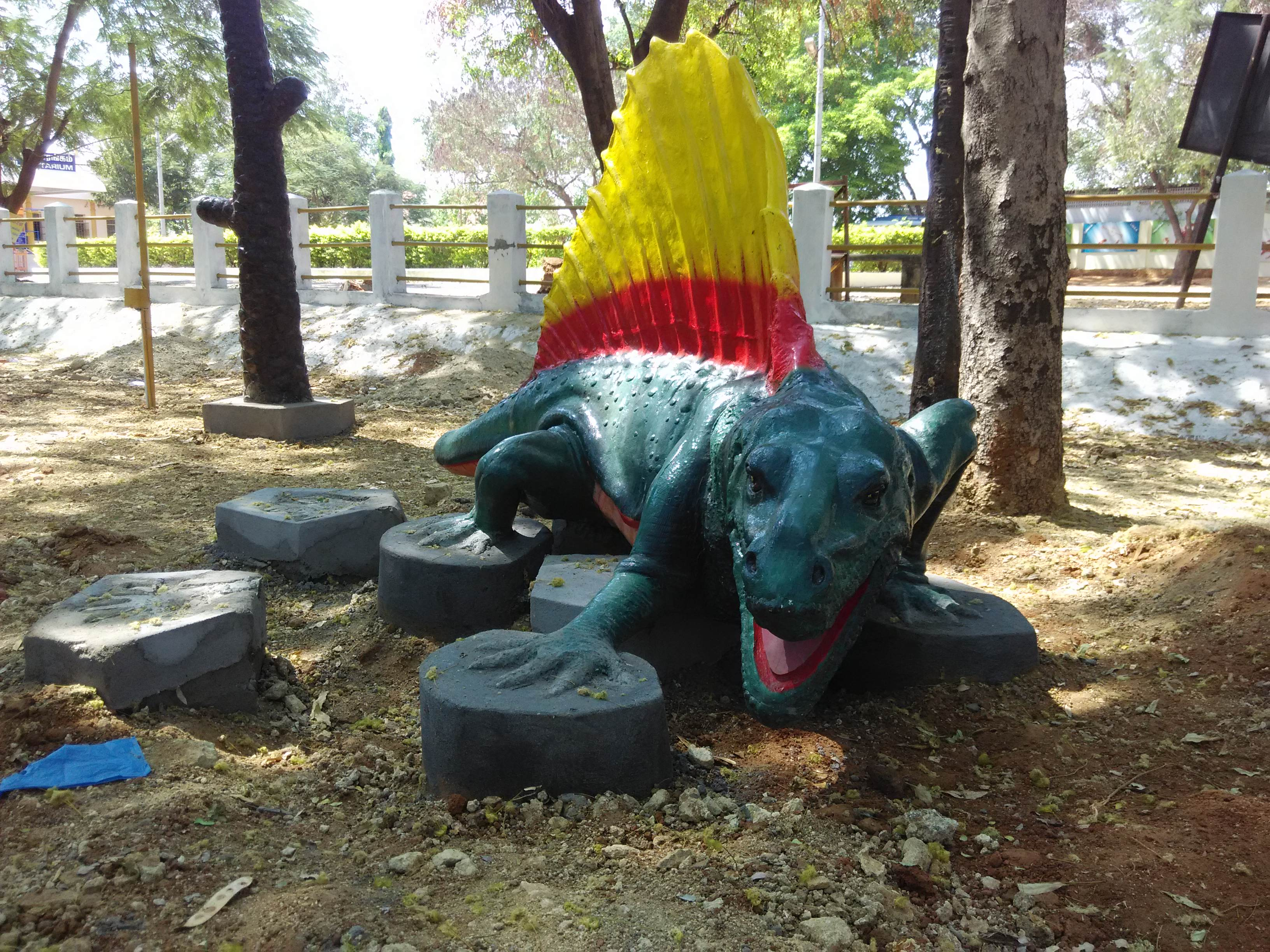
A park with Jurassic age fauna models is situated side by the main building.

== See also ==
- Astrotourism in India
- Birla Planetarium, Chennai
- List of planetariums
