= Moscow Planetarium =

Planetarium in Moscow, Russia

- Московский планетарий
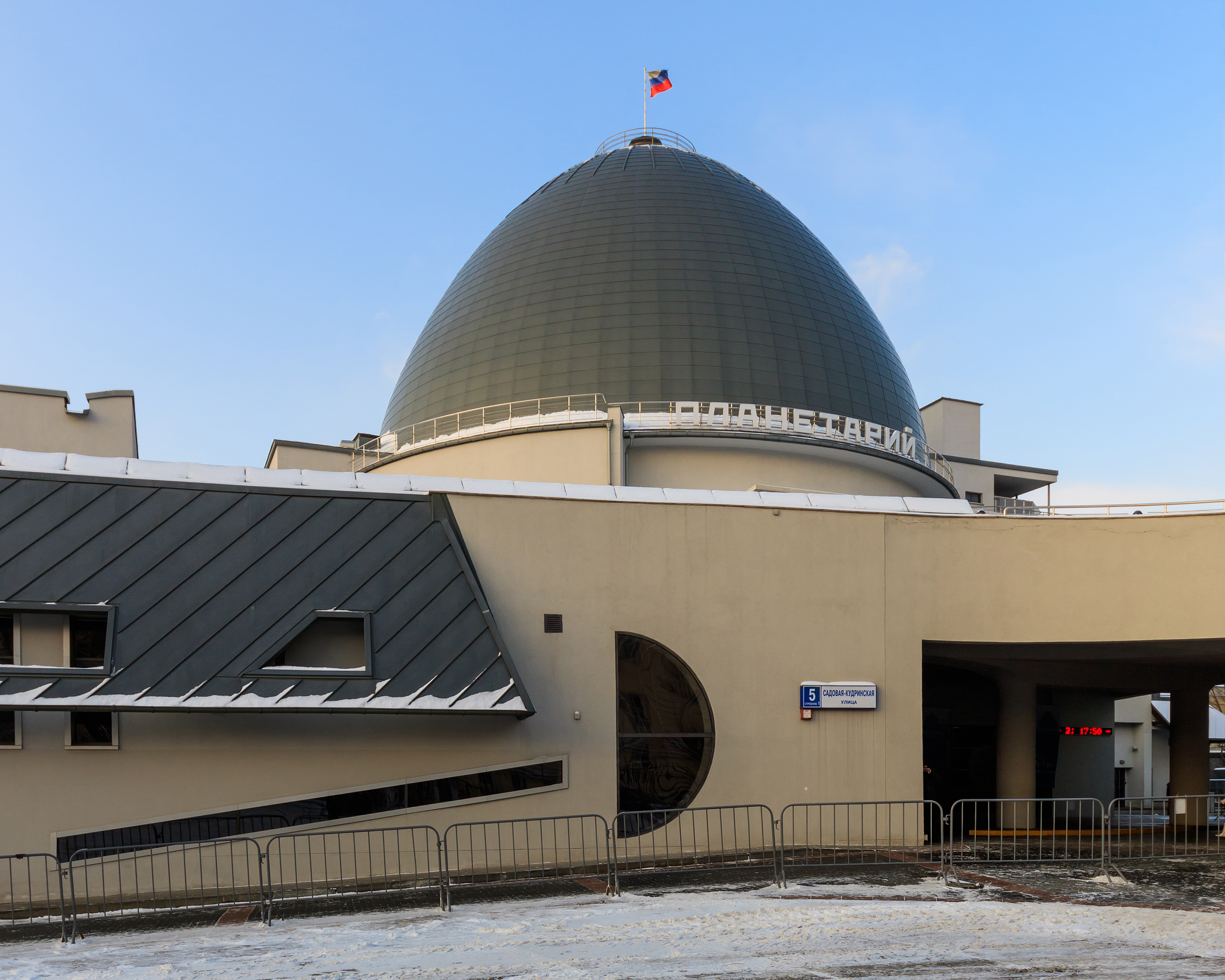

General information
- Location: Moscow, Russia
- Coordinates: 55.7614°N 37.5836°E
- Opened: 5 November 1929
- Renovated: 1994–2011

Design and construction
- Architects: Mikhail Barsh, Mikhail Sinyavsky
- Engineer: Georgy Zunblat

The Moscow Planetarium (Russian: Московский планетарий) is a planetarium in Moscow, Russia. It is the oldest planetarium in Russia.

== History ==
The planetarium was built in 1927–1929. It was officially opened on 5 November 1929. It was closed for renovation in 1994 and reopened in June 2011. The building was significantly renovated and expanded, making it, according to the planetarium, the largest planetarium in Europe.

The renovation altered the original design of the planetarium, with the main building raised six meters to fit two additional stories beneath the dome.

== Architecture ==
The planetarium was built by Constructivist architects Mikhail Barsh, Mikhail Sinyavsky, and engineer Georgy Zunblat. The main dome of the planetarium features a 25-meter diameter dome screen.

== Exhibitions ==
The planetarium shows movies about Solar System. The interactive area displays 92 exhibits.
