= Johannesburg Planetarium =

Planetarium in Braamfontein, South Africa

Coordinates: 26°11′18.61″S 28°01′42.08″E

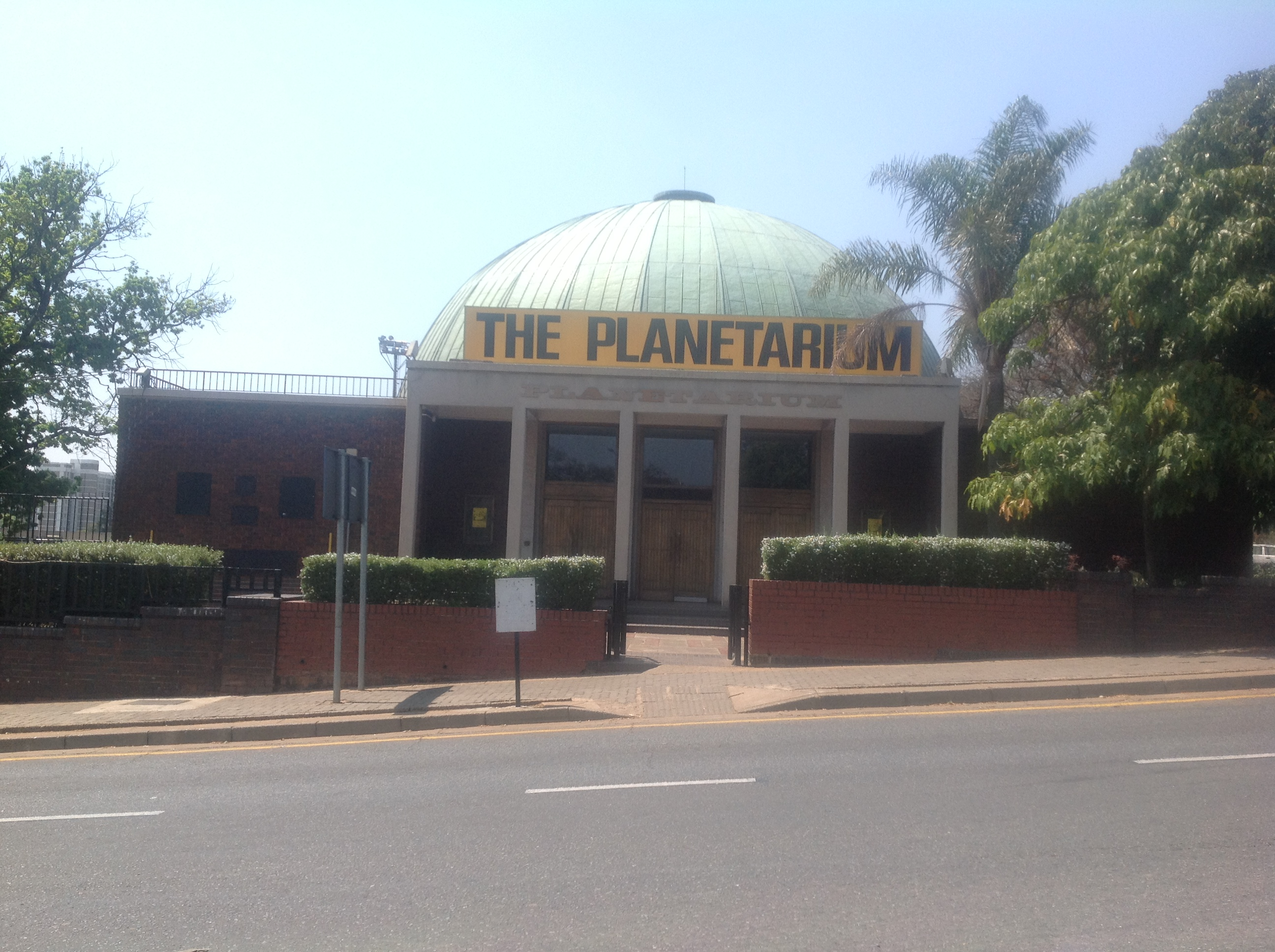
- The Johannesburg Planetarium seen from Yale Road
- Established: Construction: 1959 Opened: 12 October 1960; 65 years ago
- Location: University of the Witwatersrand, Braamfontein, South Africa

The Johannesburg Planetarium is a planetarium owned by the University of the Witwatersrand, located on the University's East Campus in Braamfontein, Johannesburg. It was the first full-sized planetarium in Africa, and the second in the southern hemisphere.

== History ==
The idea of setting up a planetarium in Johannesburg was first discussed in 1956 when the Festival Committee — which had been instituted to organise the celebrations of Johannesburg's seventieth anniversary — decided to raise the funds necessary to buy and house a Zeiss planetarium to be set up for the celebrations. As there was too little time to obtain a new instrument, it was decided to buy an existing planetarium projector from Europe.

After lengthy negotiations, the Festival Committee was successful in persuading the Parliament of Hamburg to sell their planetarium's projector which had been in use there since 1930. The Hamburg Parliament, however, imposed as its conditions that the planetarium's projector be fully modernised in the Zeiss factory at Oberkochen, and that Johannesburg would in due course have a new planetarium built for Hamburg. The Hamburg projector was immediately dismantled and moved to Oberkochen for an overhaul, and was in time completely rebuilt.

Soon, the responsibilities of the Festival Committee were taken over by the Johannesburg City Council, which after further negotiations, sold the projector to the University of the Witwatersrand for use as both an academic facility for the instruction of students, and as a public amenity. Plans for a new building to house the projector were first drawn up in 1958, and construction began in 1959. The planetarium finally opened on 12 October 1960.

The Johannesburg Planetarium is often consulted by the media, and the public, in order to explain unusual occurrences in the skies over South Africa. In 2010, the Johannesburg Planetarium celebrated its golden jubilee.
