= Zeiss projector =

Range of projectors made by Zeiss

The Mark I projector installed in the Deutsches Museum in 1923 was the world's first planetarium projector.

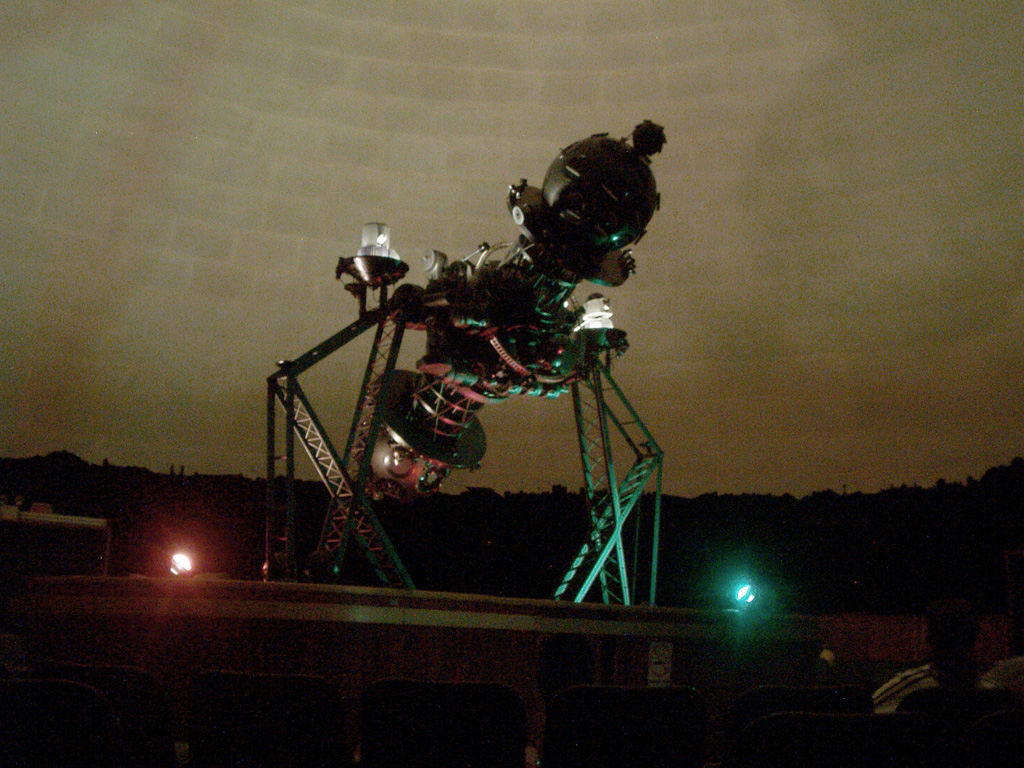
The Mark III modified projector installed in the Planetario Humboldt 1950 in Caracas - Venezuela.It is the oldest in Latin America.

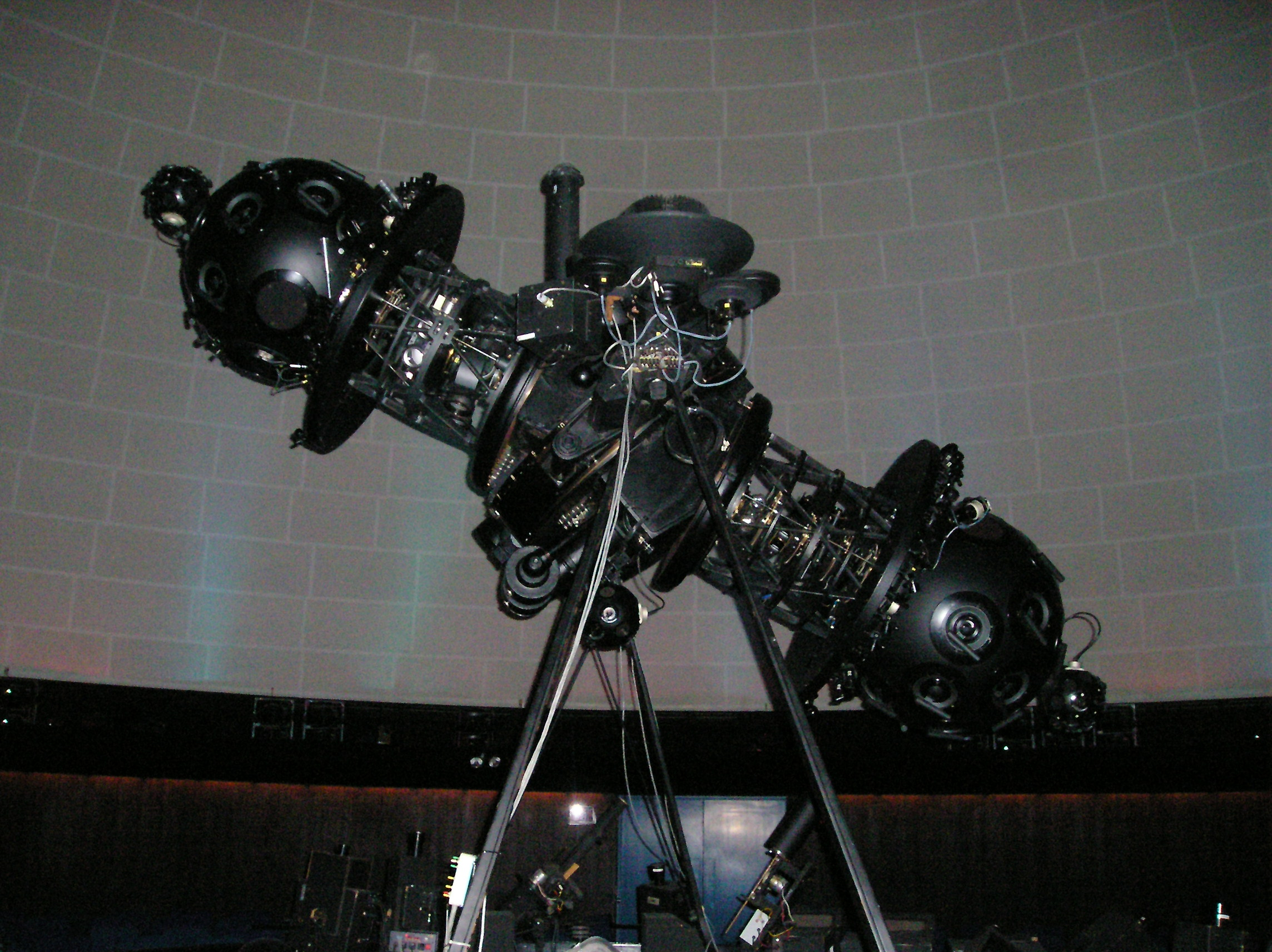
Marks II through VI utilized two small spheres of lenses separated along a central axis.

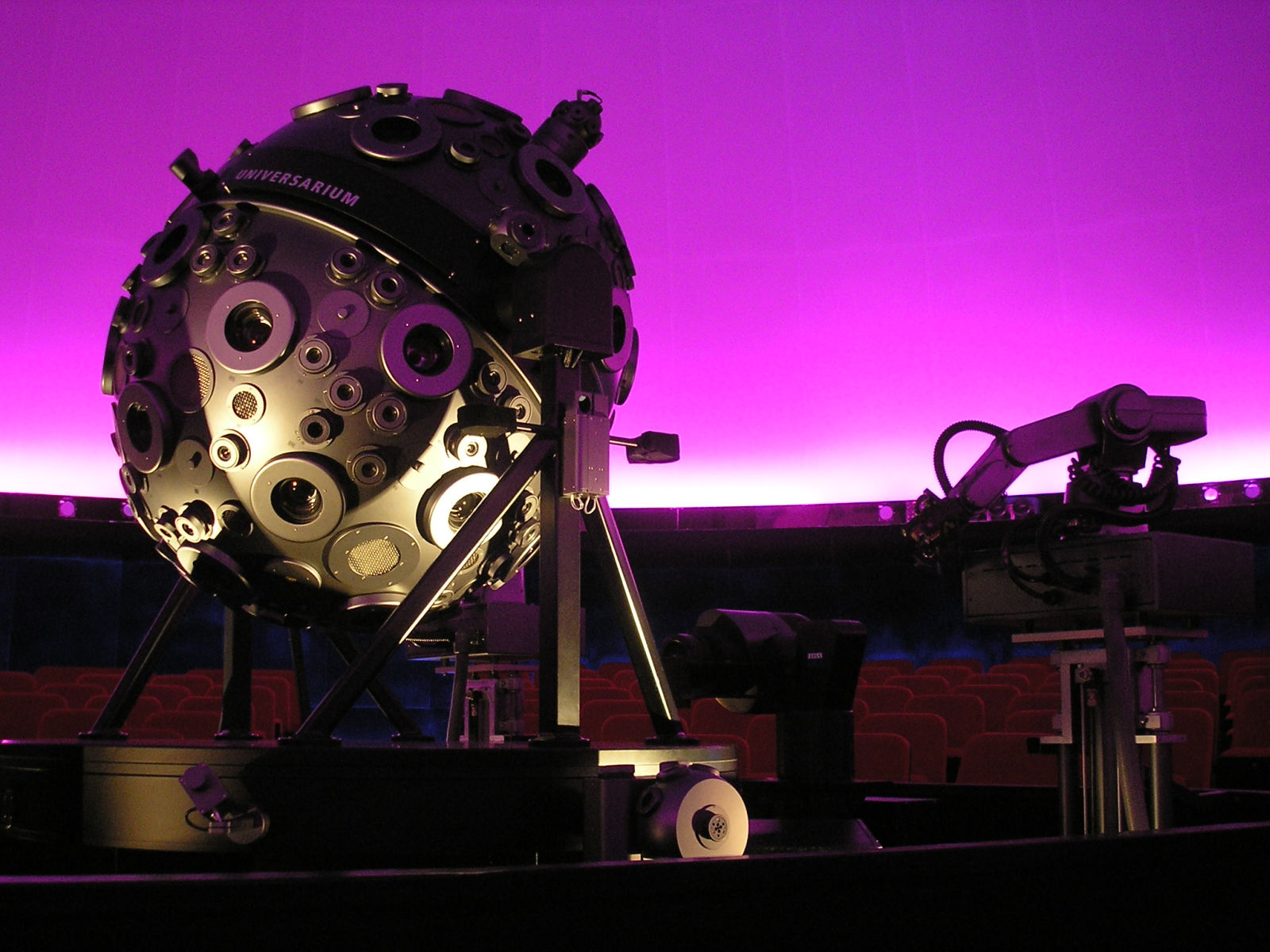
Beginning with Mark VII, Zeiss projectors adopted a new, egg-shaped design.

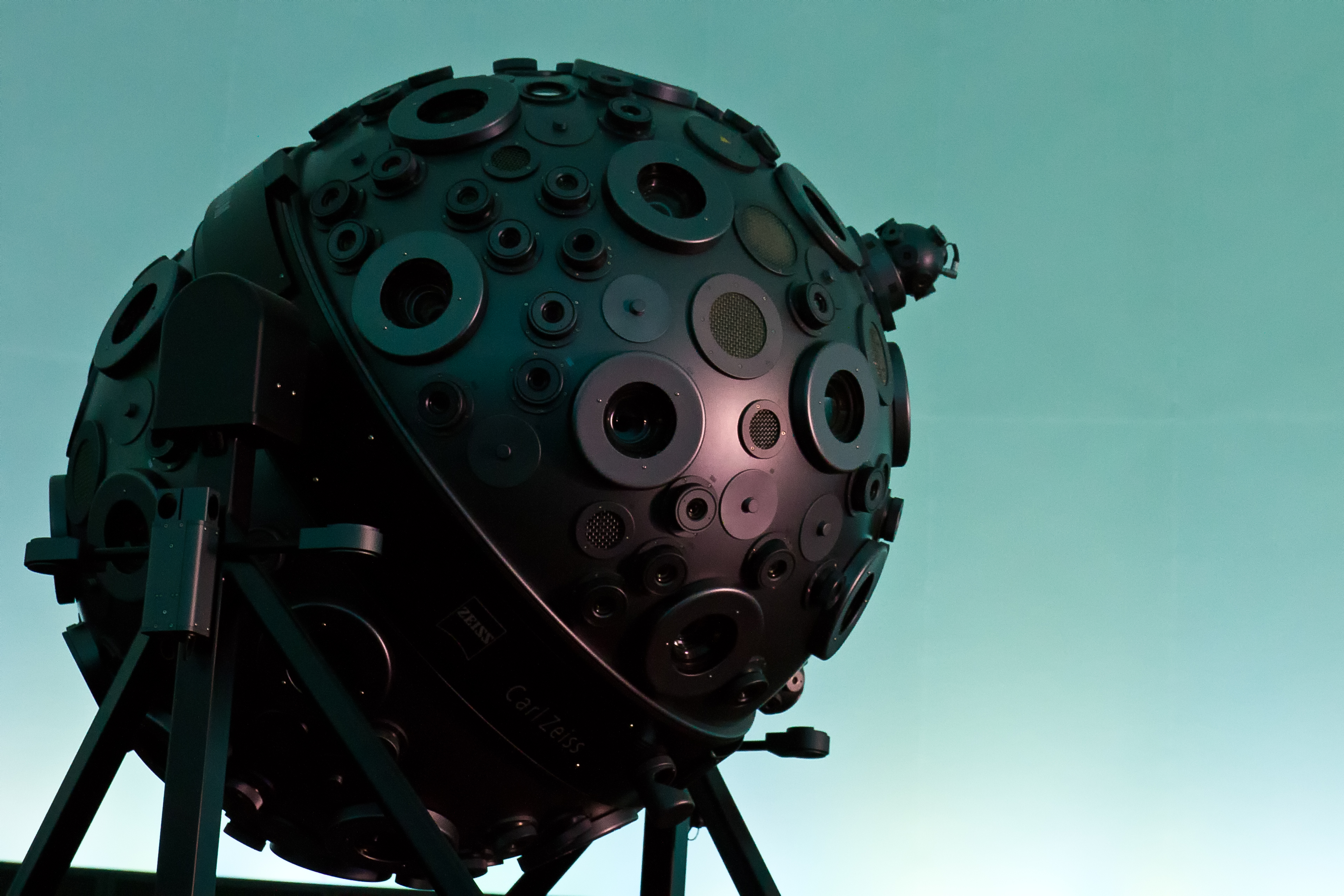
The Mark IX Universarium is currently the most advanced model. This example was installed in 2006 at The Griffith Observatory in Los Angeles.

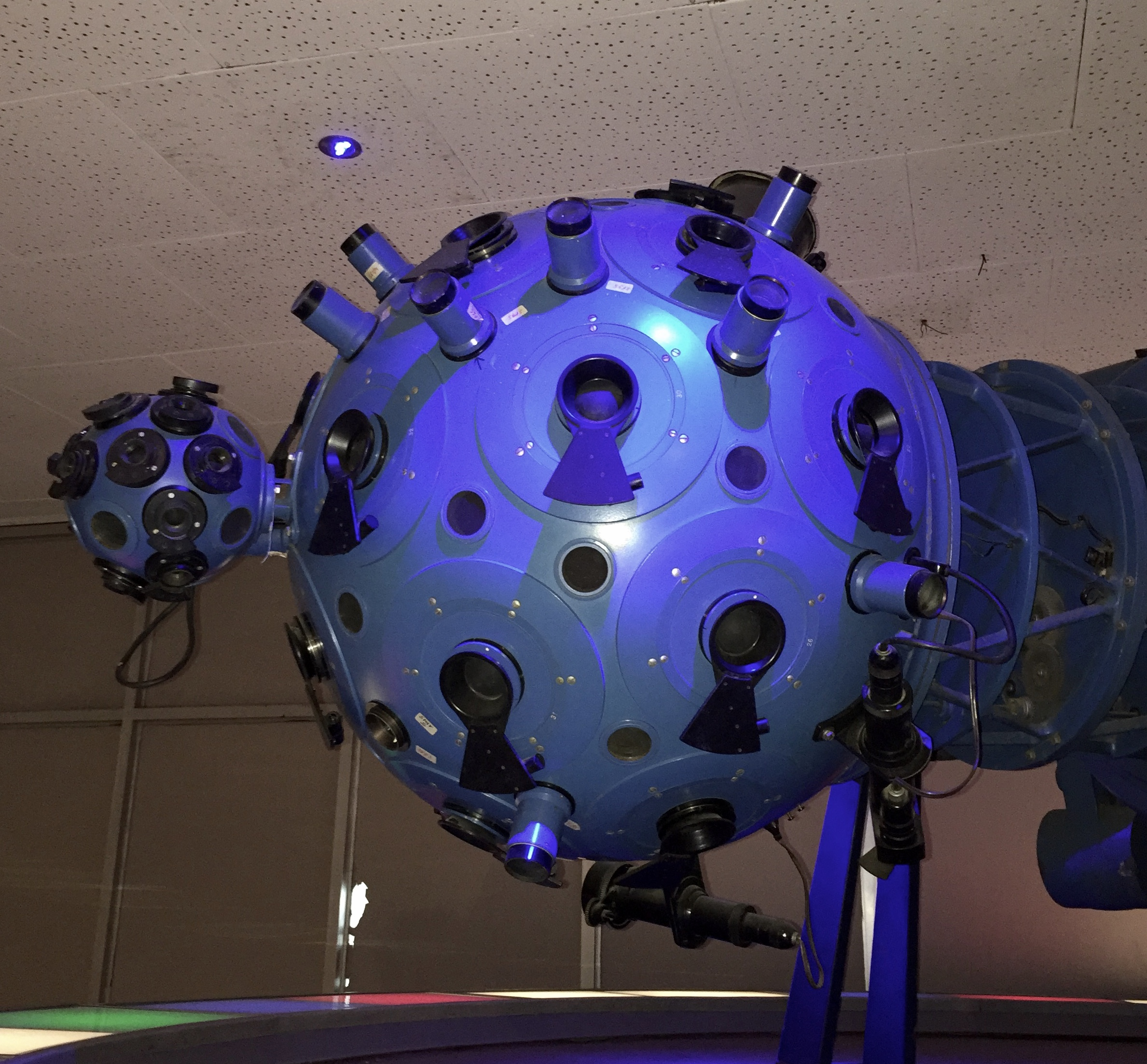
Closeup of a lens bearing sphere of the Zeiss Mark IV planetarium projector on display at the Nehru Planetarium in Mumbai, India.

A Zeiss projector is one of a line of planetarium projectors manufactured by the Carl Zeiss Company. Main models include Copernican (1924), Model I (1925), Model II (1926), Model III (1957), Model IV (1957), Model V (1965), Model VI (1968), Spacemaster (1970), Cosmorana (1984), Skymaster ZKP2 (1977), and Skymaster ZKP3 (1993).

The first modern planetarium projectors were designed and built in 1924 by the Zeiss Works of Jena, Germany. Zeiss projectors are designed to sit in the middle of a dark, dome-covered room and project an accurate image of the stars and other astronomical objects on the dome. They are generally large, complicated, and imposing machines.

The first Zeiss Mark I projector (the first planetarium projector in the world) was installed in the Deutsches Museum in Munich in August, 1923. It possessed a distinctive appearance, with a single sphere of projection lenses supported above a large, angled "planet cage". Marks II through VI were similar in appearance, using two spheres of star projectors separated along a central axis that contained projectors for the planets. Beginning with Mark VII, the central axis was eliminated and the two spheres were merged into a single, egg-shaped projection unit.

== History of development and production ==
The Mark I was created in 1923–1924 and was the world's first modern planetarium projector. The Mark II was developed during the 1930s by Carl Zeiss AG in Jena. Following WWII division of Germany and the founding of Carl Zeiss (West Germany) in Oberkochen (while the original Jena plant was located in East Germany), each factory developed its own line of projectors.

Marks III – VI were developed in Oberkochen (West Germany) from 1957 to 1989. Meanwhile, the East German facility in Jena developed the ZKP projector line. The Mark VII was developed in 1993 and was the first joint project of the two Zeiss factories following German reunification.

As of 2011, Zeiss currently manufactures three main models of planetarium projectors. The flagship Universarium models continue the "Mark" model designation and use a single "starball" design, where the fixed stars are projected from a single egg-shaped projector, and moving objects such as planets have their own independent projectors or are projected using a full-dome digital projection system. The Starmaster line of projectors are designed for smaller domes than the Universarium, but also use the single starball design. The Skymaster ZKP projectors are designed for the smallest domes and use a "dumbbell" design similar to the Mark II-VI projectors, where two smaller starballs for the northern and southern hemispheres are connected by a truss containing projectors for planets and other moving objects.

== List of planetariums that have featured a Zeiss projector ==
Between 1923 and 2011, Zeiss manufactured a total of 631 projectors. Therefore, the following table is highly incomplete.

Planetarium	Zeiss Projector Model	Acquisition Date	End Date	Remarks
Sijthoff planetarium, The Hague, Netherlands	Mark I	1934	1976	Destroyed by fire, although the projector has been restored.
Silesian Planetarium, Chorzów, Poland	Mark II	1955	2018	Silesian Planetarium, the oldest Mark II still in use worldwide, the oldest and biggest planetarium in Poland. Retired in July 2018, will be reopened after upgrade in mid 2020.
Tycho Brahe Planetarium, Copenhagen, Denmark	Starmaster	1989	2012	The only experienced operator in Denmark retired in 2012. Jesper H.
Adler Planetarium, Chicago, Illinois, USA	Mark II/III	1930	1969	Projector was converted from Mark II to Mark III from 1959 to 1961
Adler Planetarium, Chicago, Illinois, USA	Mark VI	1969	2011	Replaced with "Digital Starball" system from Global Immersion Ltd.
Planetario Luis Enrique Erro, Mexico City, Mexico	Mark IV	1964	2006	It was the first planetarium in Mexico opened to general public and it is also one of the oldest in Latin America.
Planetario LIC. Felipe Rivera, Morelia, México.	Mark IV	1975	Present	One of the oldest still operational in Latin America.
Planetario Simon Bolivar, Maracaibo, Venezuela	Starmaster	1968	Present	It was the second planetarium in Venezuela.
SDSK Budapest Planetarium, Budapest, Hungary	Mark VI	1969	2017	The planetarium closed indefinitely in 2017 due to rain damage.
Buhl Planetarium, Pittsburgh, Pennsylvania, USA	Mark II	1939	1994	Now on exhibit (but not in operation) at the Kamin Science Center.
Ukraine. Kyiv planetarium	Mark IV	1988	Present	The dome is the second largest in Europe with a screen area of 830 m^{2}
Bangkok Planetarium, Bangkok, Thailand	Mark IV	1964	2016	Replaced by an Evans & Sutherland Digistar 5. The projector is still inside the planetarium but not in operation.
Denki kagakukan, Osaka, Japan	Mark II (No.23)	1937	1989	First Planetarium in Japan; Preserved at Osaka Science Museum.
Tonichi Tenmonkan, Tokyo, Japan	Mark II (No.26)	1938	25 May 1945	Destroyed by Bombing of Tokyo
Gotoh Planetarium, Tokyo, Japan	Mark IV(No.1)	1957	2001	
Akashi Municipal Planetarium, Akashi, Japan	Universal(UPP)23/3	1960	Present	The oldest projector which is operating in Japan.
Nagoya City Science Museum, Nagoya, Japan	Mark IV	1962	2010	Closed for renovation in August 2010
Nagoya City Science Museum, Nagoya, Japan	Mark IX	2011	Present	Re-opened in March 2011
Fernbank Planetarium, Atlanta, Georgia, USA	Mark V	1967/8?	Present	
Hamburg Planetarium, Hamburg, Germany	Mark II	1925	1957	Projector was acquired by the City of Hamburg in 1925, the planetarium was opened to the public in 1930.
Hamburg Planetarium, Hamburg, Germany	Mark IV	1957	1983	
Hamburg Planetarium, Hamburg, Germany	Mark VI	1983	2003	
Hamburg Planetarium, Hamburg, Germany	Mark IX	2006	Present	
Hayden Planetarium, New York, New York, USA	Mark II	1935	1960	
Hayden Planetarium, New York, New York, USA	Mark IV	1960	1973	
Hayden Planetarium, New York, New York, USA	Mark VI	1973	1997	
Hayden Planetarium, New York, New York, USA	Mark IX	1999	Present	
Humboldt Planetarium, Caracas, Venezuela	Mark III (modified)	1950	Present	This planetarium is the oldest in Latin America.
Johannesburg Planetarium, Johannesburg, South Africa	Mark III (upgraded from Mark II)	1960	Present	Acquired from the city of Hamburg and upgraded to Mark III prior to installation.
Manitoba Museum, Winnipeg, Manitoba, Canada	Mark Vs	1967	Present	
Telus World of Science Edmonton, Edmonton, Canada		1984	2008	
H.R. MacMillan Space Centre, Vancouver, BC, Canada	Mark IV	1967	2013	Remains in situ; replaced with six Colorspace digital video projectors.
Galileo Galilei planetarium, Buenos Aires, Argentina	Mark V	1967	2011	Replaced by MEGASTAR II A
Morehead Planetarium, Chapel Hill, North Carolina, USA	Mark II	1949	1969	
Morehead Planetarium, Chapel Hill, North Carolina, USA	Mark VI	1969	6 May 2011	
Planetarium of Tripoli, Tripoli, Libya	Spacemaster	1980	2007	not in operation but still in the building
James S. McDonnell Planetarium, St. Louis, Missouri, USA	Mark IX	2001	2026	replaced an Evans & Sutherland Digistar. Replaced in 2026 with a GOTO Chiron III Hybrid projector
Samuel Oschin Planetarium, Griffith Observatory, Los Angeles, California, USA	Mark IV	1964	2006	
Samuel Oschin Planetarium, Griffith Observatory, Los Angeles, California, USA	Mark IX	2006	Present	
Strasenburgh Planetarium, Rochester, New York, USA	Mark VI	1968	Present	Originally cost $240,234 – in 1968 dollars.
Planetario de Bogotá, Bogotá, Bogotá, Colombia	Mark VI	1969	Present	
Fiske Planetarium, Boulder, Colorado, USA	Mark VI	1975	2012	Replaced by an Ohira Tech MEGASTAR.
Planetario Universidad de Santiago, Santiago, Chile	Mark VI	1972	Present	
Calouste Gulbenkian Planetarium, Lisbon, Portugal	UPP 23/4	1965	2004	
Calouste Gulbenkian Planetarium, Lisbon, Portugal	Mark IX	2005	Present	
Delafield Planetarium, Agnes Scott College, Decatur, Georgia, USA	Skymaster ZKP-3	2000	Present	
Charles Hayden Planetarium, Boston Museum of Science, Boston, MA, USA	Mark VI	1970	2010	
Charles Hayden Planetarium, Boston Museum of Science, Boston, MA, USA	Starmaster	2011	Present	
Nehru Planetarium, Mumbai, India	Mark IV	1977	2003	Replaced by an Evans & Sutherland Digistar 3
Planetario Ulrico Hoepli, Milan, Italy	Mark IV	1968	Present	
Planetario Ciudad de Rosario, Rosario, Santa Fe, Argentina	Mark IV	1962	Present	Projector was acquired by the City of Rosario in 1962, the planetarium was opened to the public in 1984
Planetarium (Belgium), Brussels, BELGIUM	Mark II	1935	1966	Planetarium was closed between 1939 and 1954. Closed again in 1966. Building and projector were destroyed in 1969. A new building with a new projector was built in 1976.
Planetarium (Belgium), Brussels, BELGIUM	UPP 23/5	1976	present	Planetarium was closed between 1939 and 1954. Closed again in 1966. Building and projector were destroyed in 1969. A new building with a new projector was built in 1976.
Moscow Planetarium, Moscow, Russia	Mark II	1929	1976	Details preserved at Moscow Planetarium
Moscow Planetarium, Moscow, Russia	Mark VI	1977	1994	Preserved at Moscow Planetarium; Planetarium ceased work in 1994
Moscow Planetarium, Moscow, Russia	Mark IX	2010	Present	Projector was acquired in 2010, the planetarium was renovated and opened to the public in 2011
London Planetarium, Baker Street, London, UK	Mark IV	1958	1995	Now in Science Museum collection.
Chabot Space and Science Center, Oakland, California, USA	Mark VIII	1999	Present	As of 2016, the Mark VIII projector unit was successfully repaired, after several years being dysfunctional.
Cozmix, Bruges, Belgium	ZKP 3b	2002	Present	
Espaço do Conhecimento do UFMG, Belo Horizonte, Minas Gerais, Brazil	ZKP 4	2010	Present	
Dow Planetarium, Montreal, Quebec, Canada	Mark V	1966	2011	Now at exhibit at the new planetarium
Sri Lanka Planetarium, Colombo, Sri Lanka	Mark IV	1965	Present	This was a gift from east Germany
Planetário Professor Francisco José Gomes Ribeiro (Colégio Estadual do Paraná), Curitiba, Paraná, Brazil	ZKP 1	1978	Present	
Planetário da Fundação Espaço Cultural, João Pessoa, Paraíba, Brazil	Spacemaster	1982	Present	
Birla Planetarium, Kolkata, India	Universal	1962		
Sardar Patel Planetarium, Vadodara, India	Spacemaster	1976		
Nehru Planetarium, Mumbai, India	Universal	1977		
Sternwarte Planetarium SIRIUS, Schwanden near Sigriswil, Switzerland	ZKP 2	2000	2014	
Sternwarte Planetarium SIRIUS, Schwanden near Sigriswil, Switzerland	ZKP 4	2014	Present	

== See also ==
- List of planetariums
- Planetarium
- Planetarium Jena
- Walther Bauersfeld
