= 1553 Bauersfelda =

Main-belt asteroid

Discovery
- Discovered by: K. Reinmuth
- Discovery site: Heidelberg Obs.
- Discovery date: 13 January 1940

Designations
- Named after: Walther Bauersfeld (German engineer)
- Alternative designations: 1940 AD
- Minor planet category: main-belt · Koronis background

Orbital characteristics
- Epoch 4 September 2017 (JD 2458000.5)
- Uncertainty parameter 0
- Observation arc: 77.47 yr (28,296 days)
- Aphelion: 3.1994 AU
- Perihelion: 2.6132 AU
- Semi-major axis: 2.9063 AU
- Eccentricity: 0.1009
- Orbital period (sidereal): 4.95 yr (1,810 days)
- Mean anomaly: 236.42°
- Mean motion: 0° 11^{m} 56.04^{s} / day
- Inclination: 3.2348°
- Longitude of ascending node: 110.97°
- Argument of perihelion: 20.747°

Physical characteristics
- Dimensions: 11.48 km (calculated); 13.772±0.194 km 14.346±0.123 km
- Synodic rotation period: 51.191±0.1354 h
- Geometric albedo: 0.2181±0.0273; 0.24 (assumed); 0.249±0.041
- Spectral type: SMASS = S · S
- Absolute magnitude (H): 11.417±0.002 (R) · 11.5 · 11.6 · 11.72±0.26 · 11.87

1553 Bauersfelda (provisional designation 1940 AD) is a stony Koronian asteroid from the outer regions of the asteroid belt, approximately 13 kilometers in diameter. It was discovered on 13 January 1940, by astronomer Karl Reinmuth at the Heidelberg Observatory in southwest Germany. The asteroid was named after German engineer Walther Bauersfeld.

== Orbit and classification ==
Bauersfelda orbits the Sun in the outer main-belt at a distance of 2.6–3.2 AU once every 4 years and 11 months (1,810 days). Its orbit has an eccentricity of 0.10 and an inclination of 3° with respect to the ecliptic. The body's observation arc begins with its official discovery observation at Heidelberg in 1940.

Based on its orbital parameters, Bauersfelda is a member of the Koronis family (605), a very large outer asteroid family with nearly co-planar ecliptical orbits. However, Bauersfelda turns out to be a non-family asteroid from the main belt's background population when applying the hierarchical clustering method to its proper orbital elements.

== Physical characteristics ==
In the SMASS classification, Bauersfelda is a stony S-type asteroid. It is also characterized as a S-type by PanSTARRS photometric survey, which agrees with the Koronis family's overall spectral type.

=== Rotation period ===
While not being a slow rotator, Bauersfelda's period is significantly longer than that of most minor planets. In August 2012, a rotational lightcurve of this asteroid was obtained from photometric observations in the R-band by astronomers at the Palomar Transient Factory in California. Lightcurve analysis gave a rotation period of 51.191 hours with a brightness variation of 0.26 magnitude (U=2).

=== Diameter and albedo ===
According to the survey carried out by the NEOWISE mission of NASA's Wide-field Infrared Survey Explorer, Bauersfelda measures 13.772 and 14.346 kilometers in diameter and its surface has an albedo of 0.2181 and 0.249, respectively. The Collaborative Asteroid Lightcurve Link assumes an albedo of 0.24 and calculates a diameter of 11.48 kilometers based on an absolute magnitude of 11.87.

== Naming ==
This minor planet was named after Walther Bauersfeld (1879–1959), a German engineer who worked at the optical manufacturer Zeiss (also see 851 Zeissia, which was named after the company's founder). Bauersfeld is known as the designer of the Zeiss made planetaria such as the Planetarium Jena. The asteroid's name was announced in the mid-1950s on the occasion of his 75th anniversary. The official naming citation was published by the Minor Planet Center in November 1953 (M.P.C. 994).
