= Megastar =

Megastar may refer to:

- Megastar, another term for "superstar", influential celebrities, people with the nickname include
  - Chiranjeevi (born 1955), Indian actor and politician
  - Sharon Cuneta (born 1966), Filipino actress, singer, and television personality
  - Assala (born 1969), Syrian singer and television personality
  - Mammooty,(born 7 September 1951) Indian Actor, Producer.
  - LA Knight (born 1982), American professional wrestler
- Megastar (projector), a series of planetarium projectors
- MS Megastar, a ro-ro/passenger ferry owned by Tallink AS

== See also ==
- Ram Charan (born 1985), Indian actor, nicknamed "Mega Power Star"
