= Takayuki Ohira =

Japanese engineer

Takayuki Ohira (大平 貴之, Ōhira Takayuki; born March 11, 1970) is a Japanese engineer and the creator of the Megastar, a planetarium projector which was recorded in Guinness World Records as the planetarium projector that can project the highest number of stars in the world.

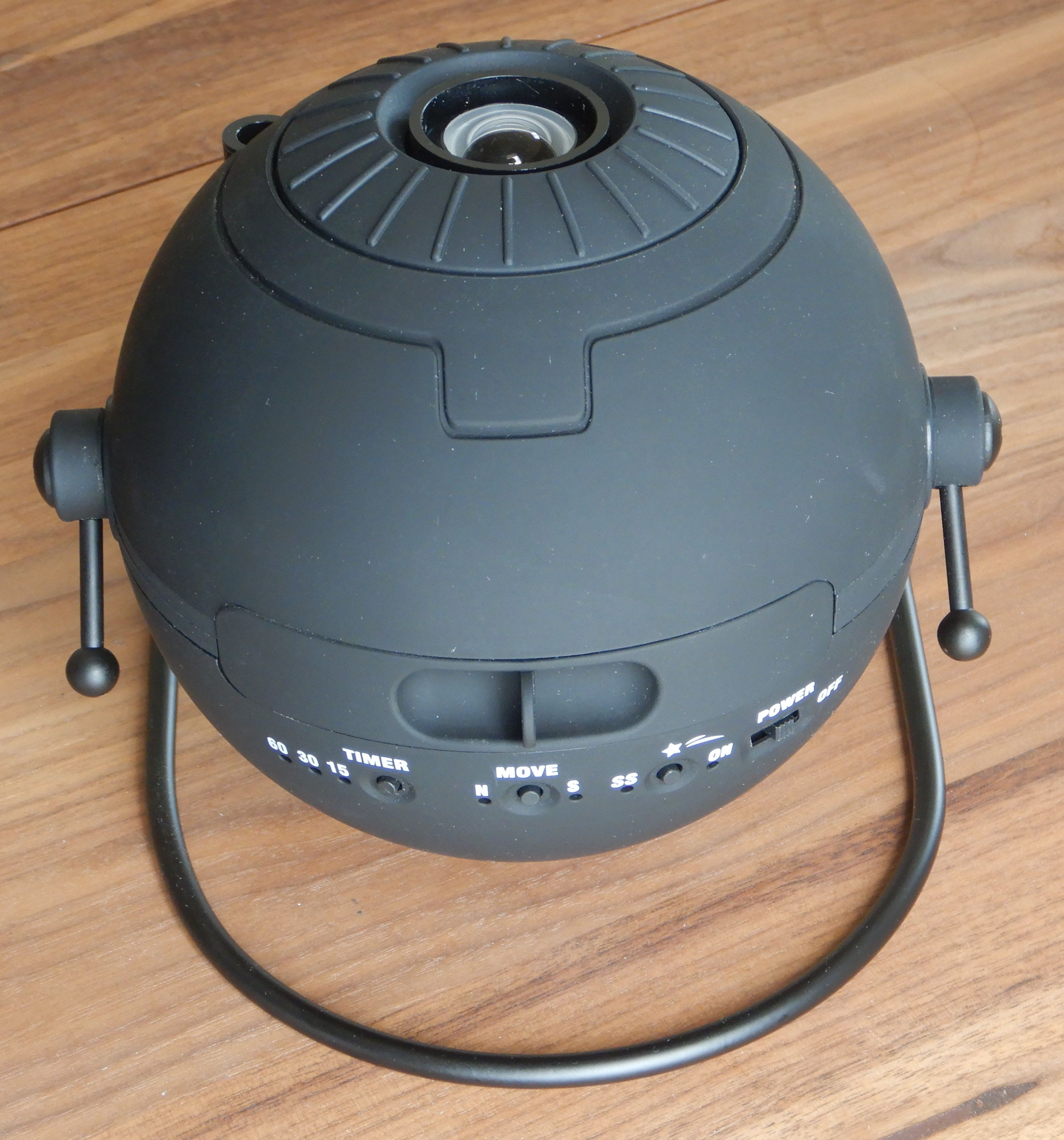
Homestar Flux: home planetarium.

Ohira has also designed the Sega Homestar, a home planetarium projector for Sega. According to the Japan Planetarium Association, the popularity of this educational toy has contributed to an increase in visitors to full-sized planetaria in Japan. The newest model, released in 2019, is called Homestar Flux.

== Profile ==
Ohira was born in Kawasaki, Kanagawa on March 11, 1970, and graduated from faculty of mechanical engineering and graduate school of precision engineering in Nihon University.
