= Hamburg Stadtpark =

Park in Hamburg, Germany

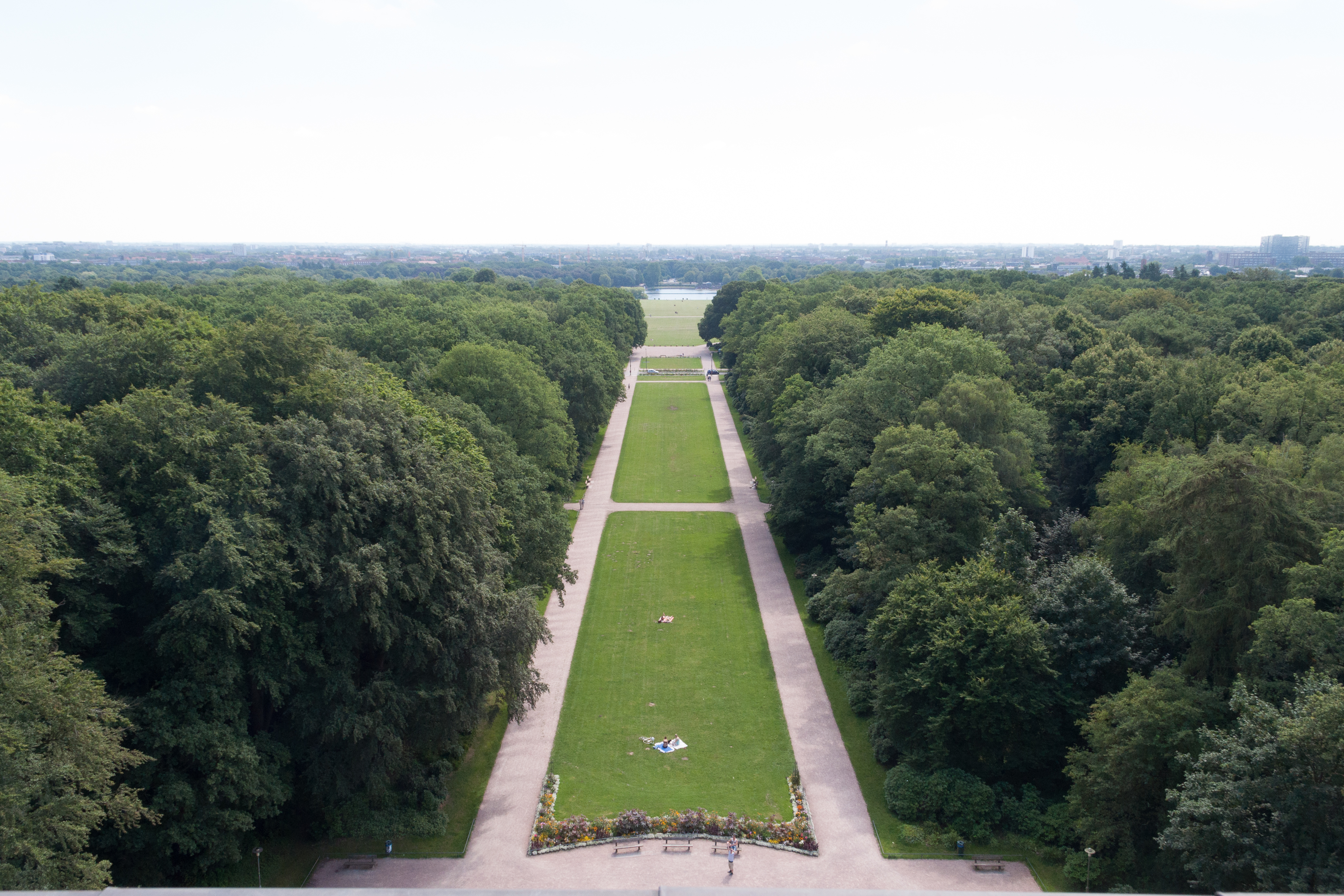
- Hamburg Stadtpark viewed from the top of Hamburg Planetarium
- Interactive map of Hamburg Stadtpark
- Type: Public park
- Location: Saarlandstraße 1; 22303 Hamburg, Germany
- Coordinates: 53°35′55″N 10°01′27″E
- Area: 148 ha (1.48 km^{2})
- Opened: 1914
- Manager: BSU
- Open: All year
- Public transit: Borgweg; Saarlandstraße
- Website: www.hamburg.de

Hamburg Stadtpark (Hamburger Stadtpark) is a large urban park in the district of Winterhude, in the Hamburg borough of Hamburg-Nord. Spanning an area of 148 hectares (366 acres), it is the second-largest park in the city after Altona Volkspark. The Stadtpark is regarded as the "green heart" of Hamburg, despite being located some 3 km from the city centre.

Opened in 1914, Hamburg Stadtpark is an important example of German landscape design and the transformation from an urban garden to an urban park.

== History ==
Like many cities during the Age of Industrialization, Hamburg grew substantially in the later decades of the 19th century and many former open spaces had been built over. In order to counterbalance this development, in 1901 the Senate of Hamburg and Hamburg Parliament agreed to purchase the so-called Sierich Grove (Sierichsches Gehölz), and to develop an urban park. In 1908 a public design competition was hosted, however, no consensus could be reached. In January 1909, head engineer Fritz Sperber presented two designs – based on the results of the competition – on behalf of the senate, one landscaped and painterly, the other geometric. In June 1909, Fritz Schumacher was made director of the city's Department of Planning and Building Inspection, and in January 1910 he and Fritz Sperber presented a design to the Parliament which was subsequently approved. The park was opened four years later, though it would be another 14 years before it was finally completed. After 1918, the gardening and landscaping work was principally carried out by Otto Linne, the first horticultural director of Hamburg.

During the bombing of Hamburg in World War II, a couple of buildings within the park were destroyed, and not rebuilt after the war. Need for additional office space in the 1960s led to the development of City Nord, a decentralized commercial district located to the north-east of Hamburg Stadtpark.

== Overview ==
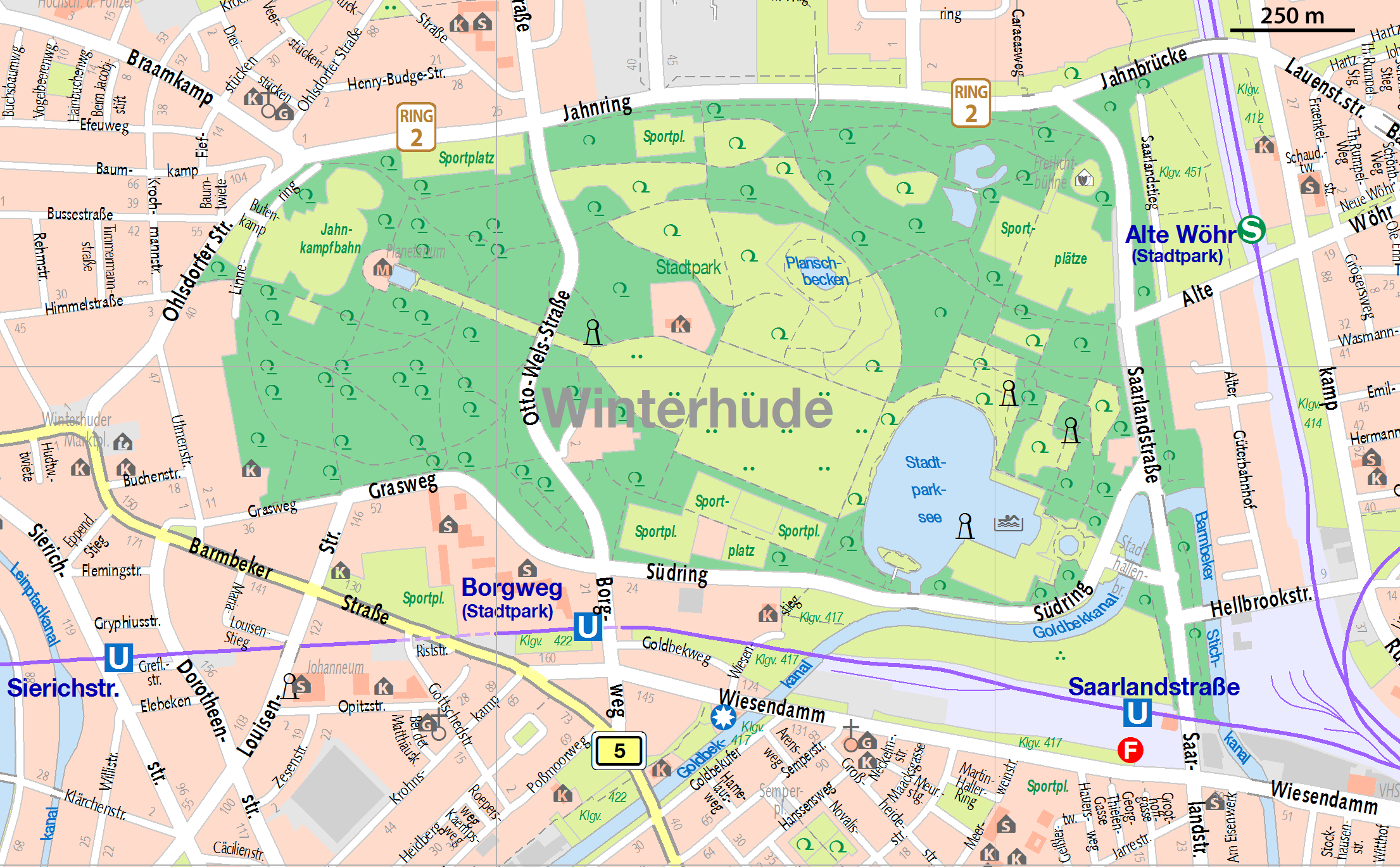
Map of Hamburg Stadtpark

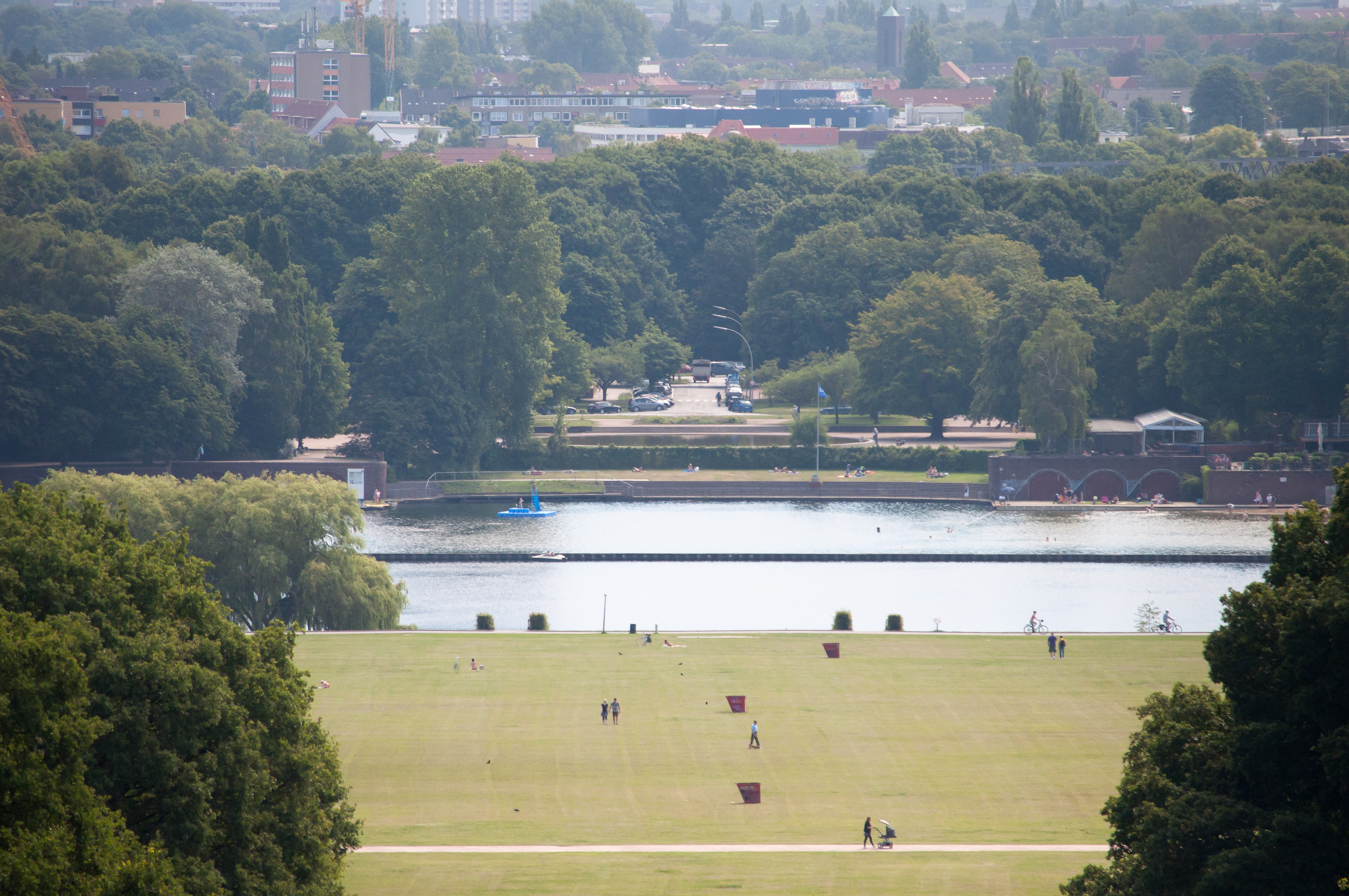
Lake and great meadow from afar

The park's most famous landmark is the Hamburg Planetarium, a former water tower. At night, the tower is illuminated in various colours. The 64-metre-tall brick tower was designed by Oskar Menzel and built in 1914. Since 1930 it has housed Germany's largest planetarium. The tower is located in the western half of the park and can be reached via a 500-metre-long avenue on its eastern side. This avenue leads onto the Great Meadow (Festwiese), which borders onto the artificial Stadtpark Lake (Stadtparksee).

Midway, the park is crossed by a street. Most of the park's western half and the park's edges are made up of wild woods. Around the edge of the park there are also a number of sporting grounds and sporting halls, an outdoor lido and an athletics stadium. Dozens of playgrounds and sport facilities are spread throughout the park. The home stadium of Hamburg Rugby Club is at Saarlandstraße in the north-east of the park. In the very north-eastern corner lies the Freilichtbühne, an open air stage for music concerts.

The lake is connected to Hamburg's extensive network of waterways via the Goldbekkanal. Alster ferries run services between the Stadtpark and Jungfernstieg in the inner city.

Every year in September, a vintage car race takes place at Hamburg Stadtpark (Stadtpark-Revival).

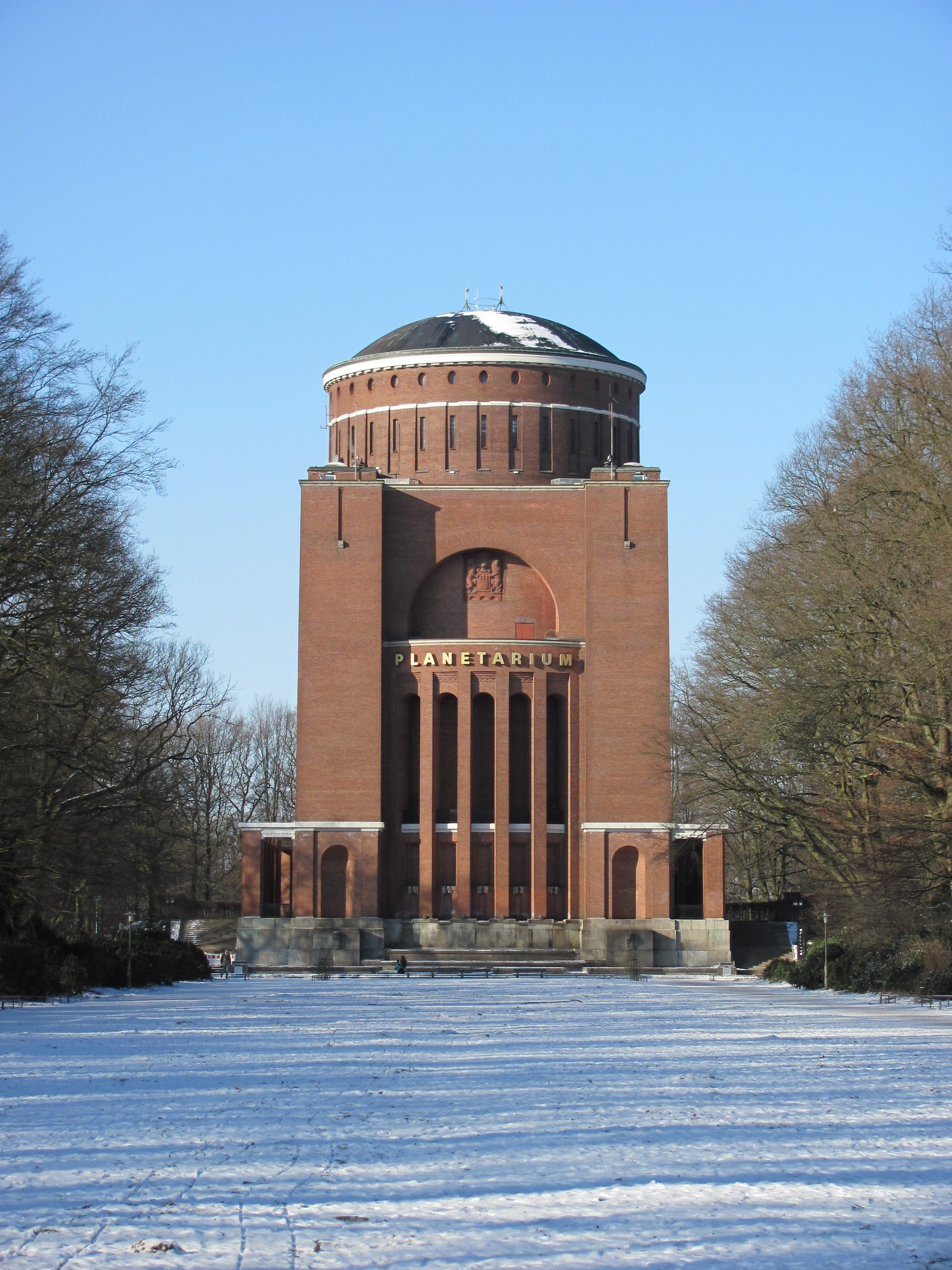
Planetarium

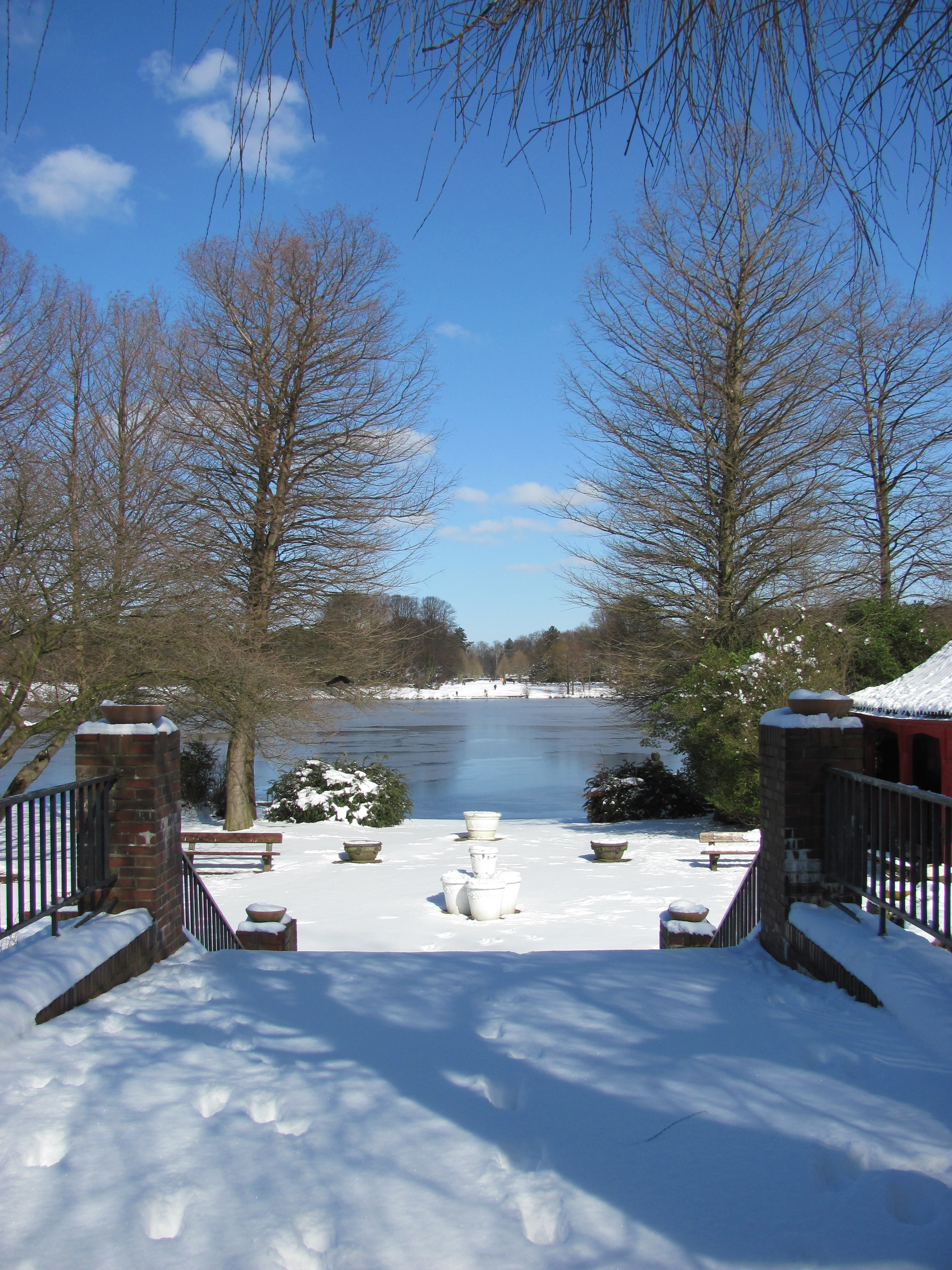
Lake

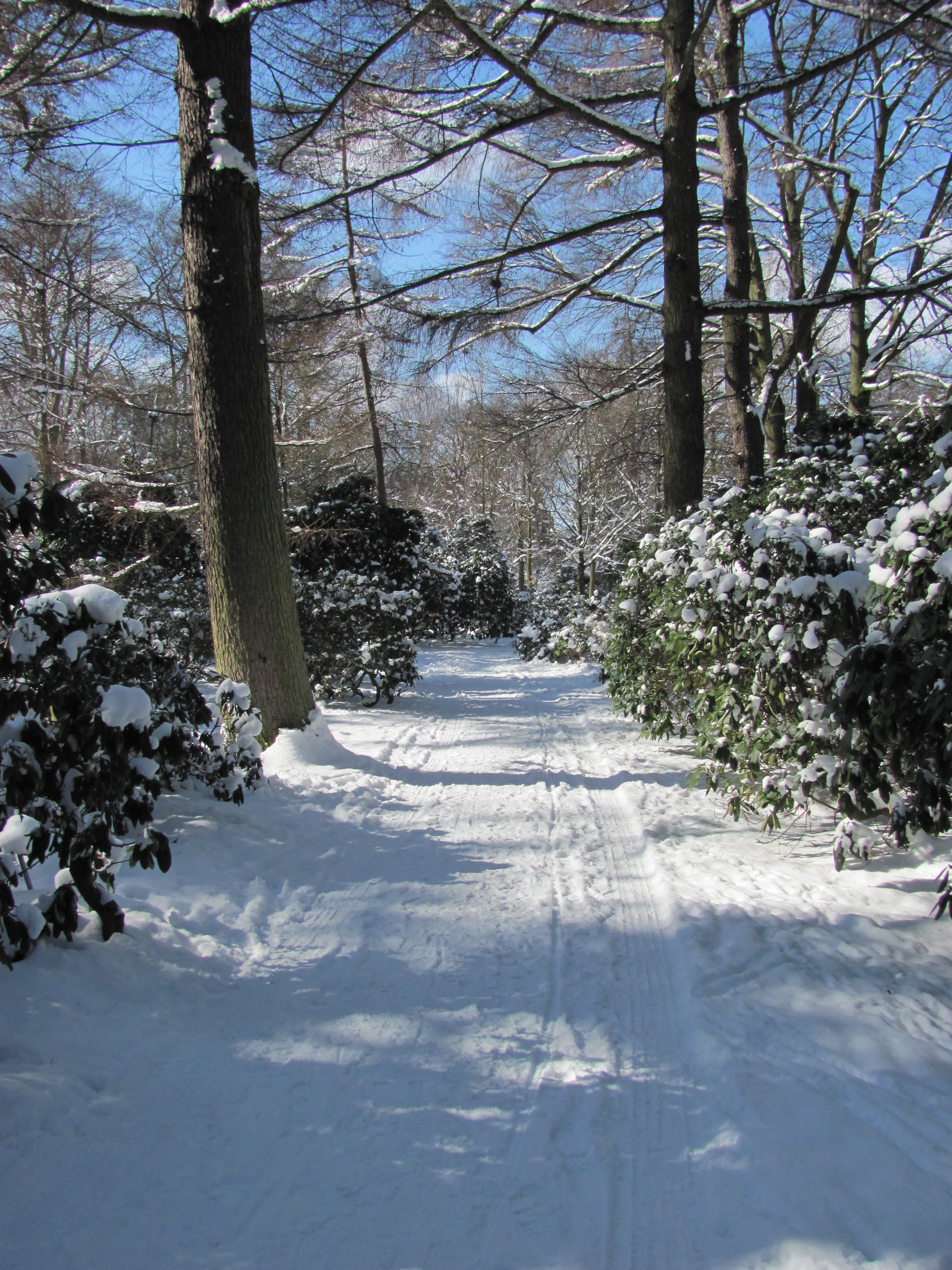
Pathway

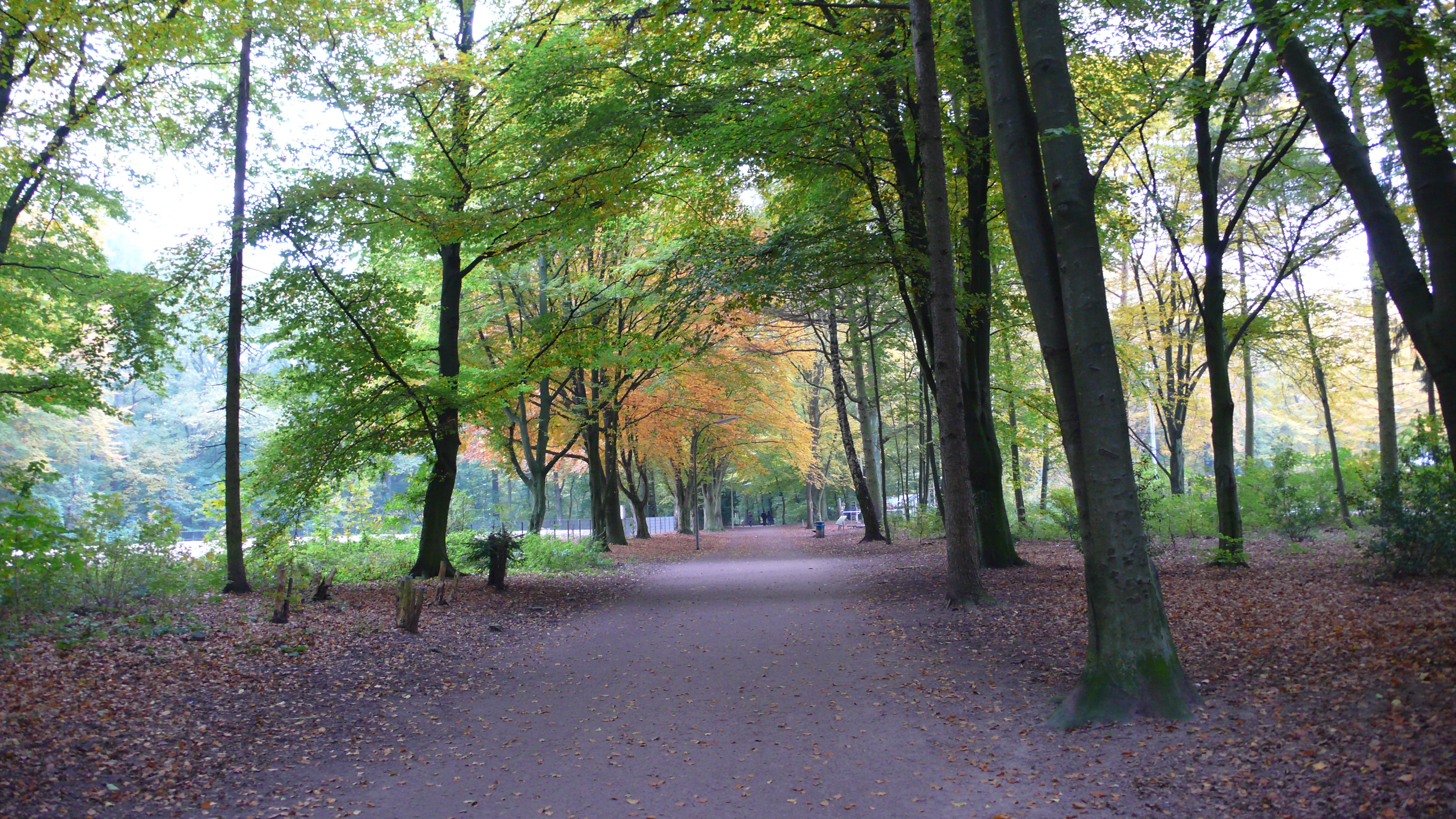
Pathway and meadows

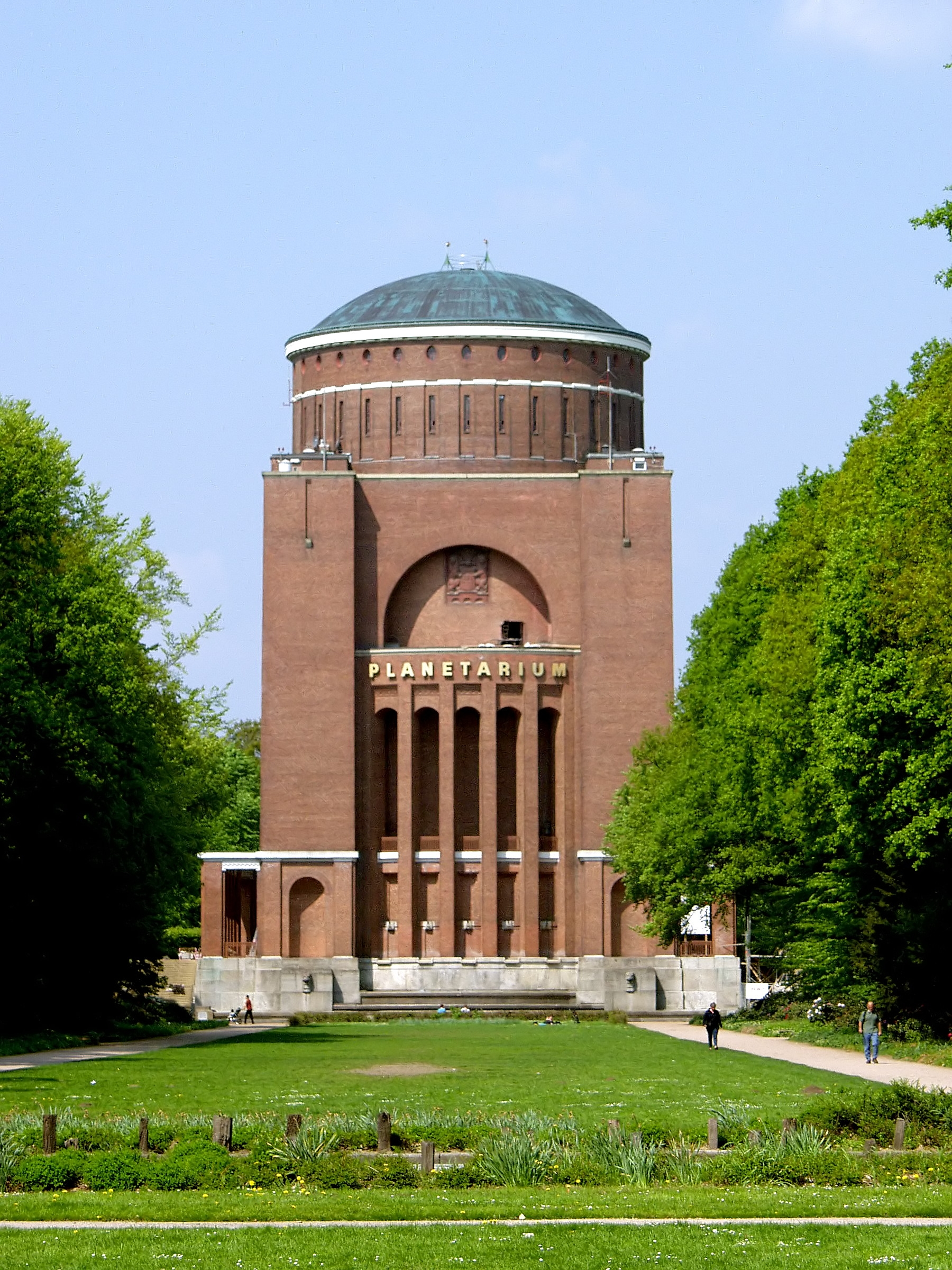
Planetarium

== Public art ==
22 privately sponsored pieces of mostly stone and bronze public art are displayed throughout Hamburg Stadtpark. Here are some of them:

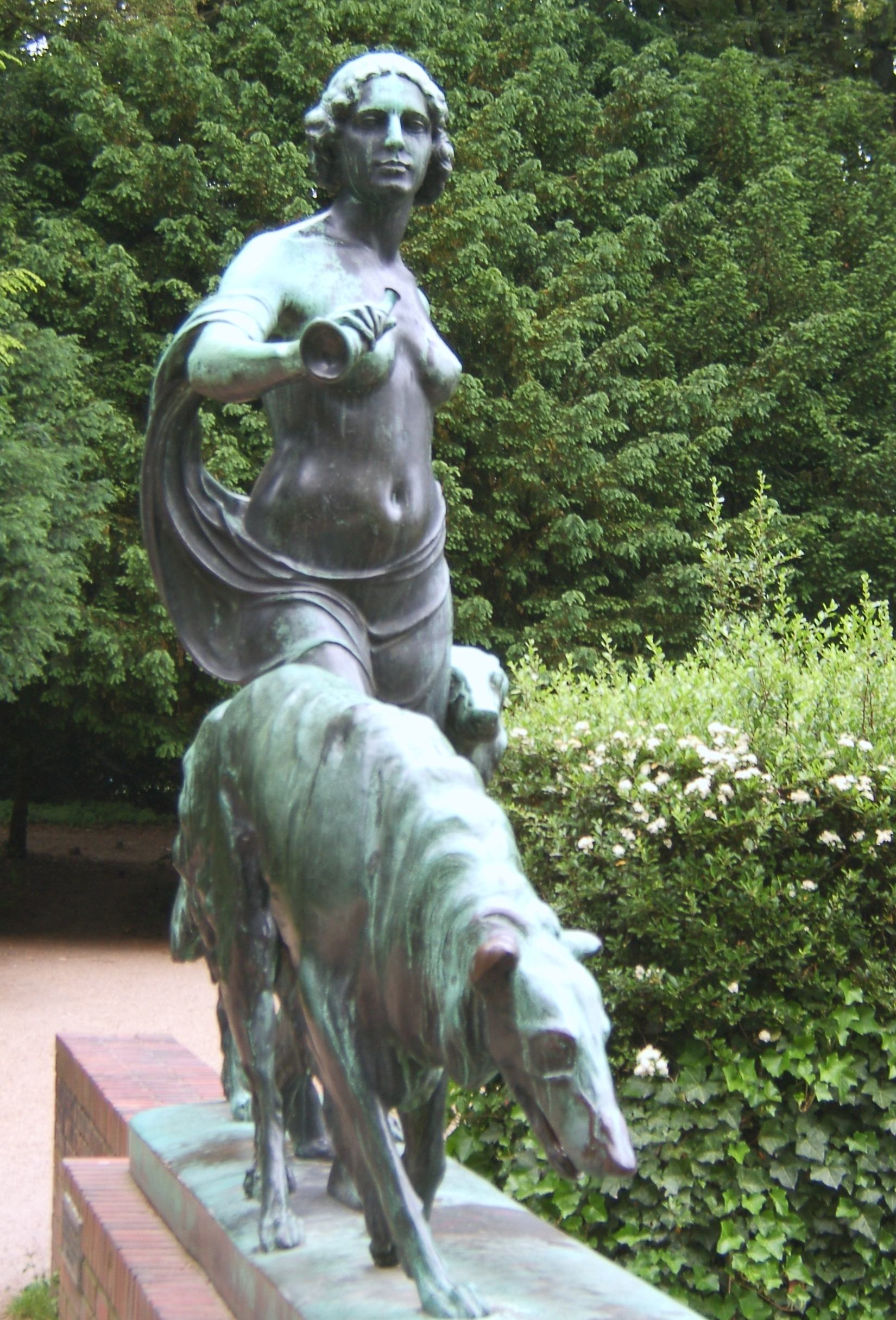
Diana with dogs (1911) by Oscar Troplowitz

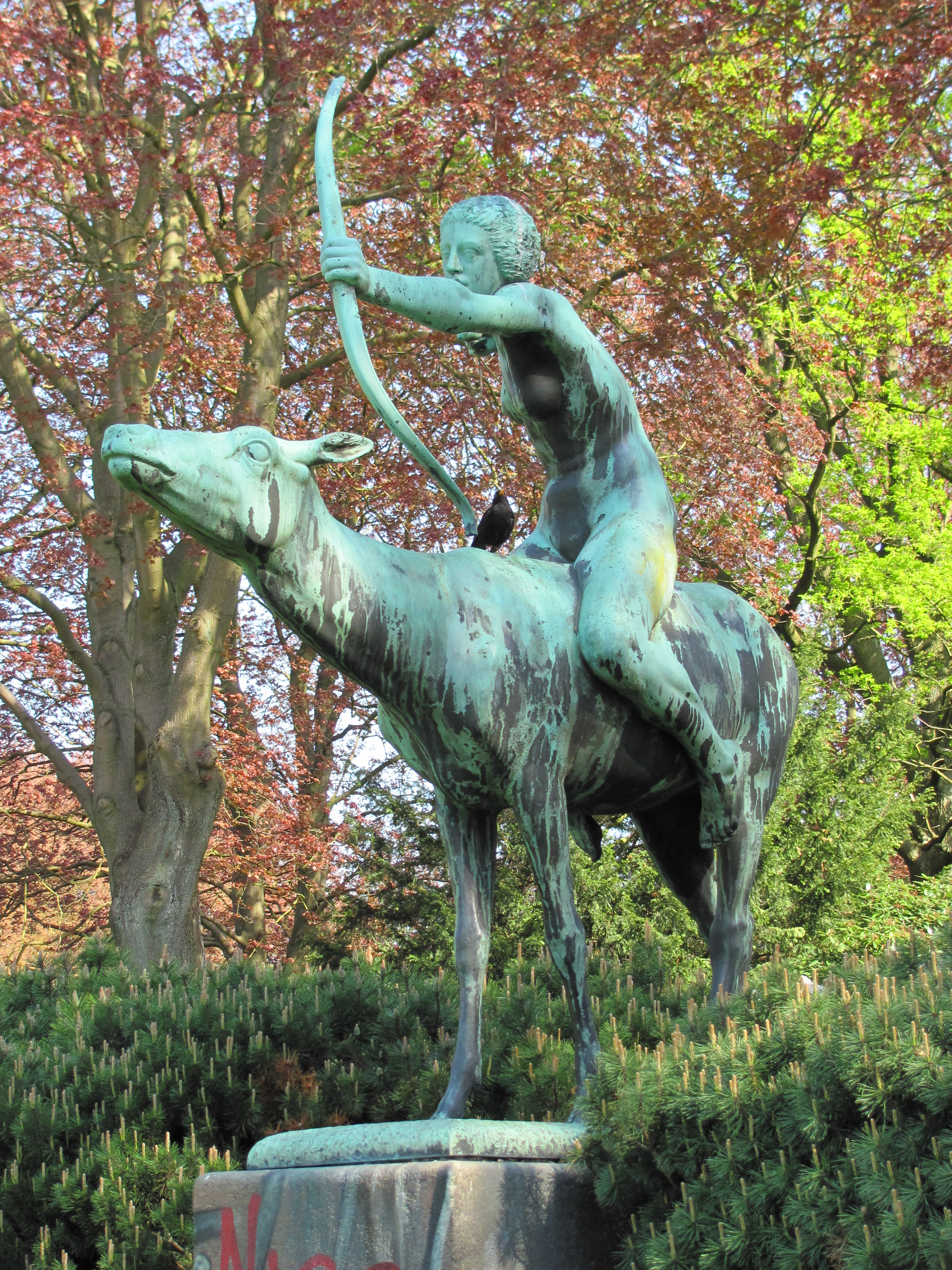
Diana on a doe (1910) by Georg Wrba

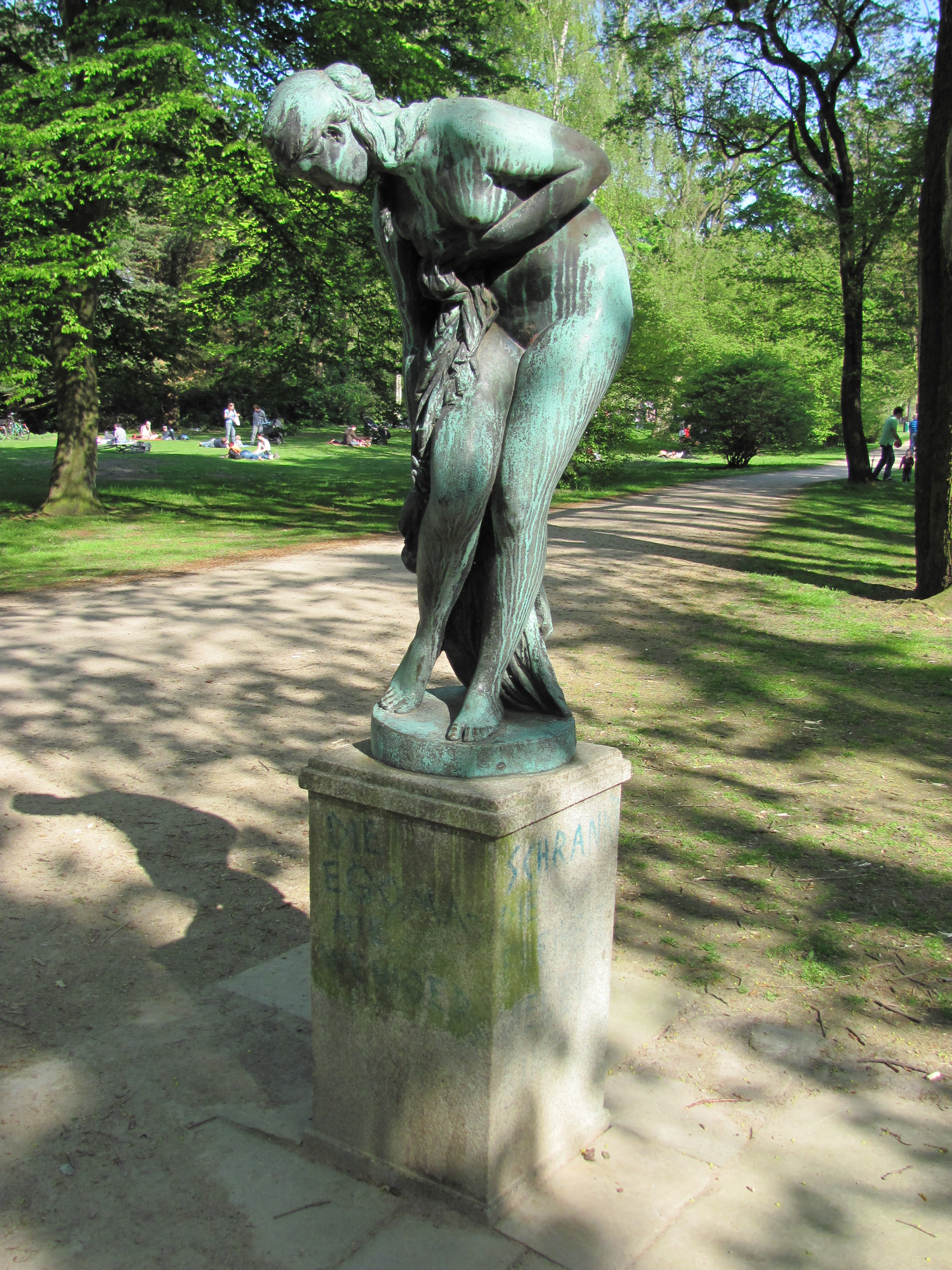
Bathing Women (1926) by Reinhold Begas

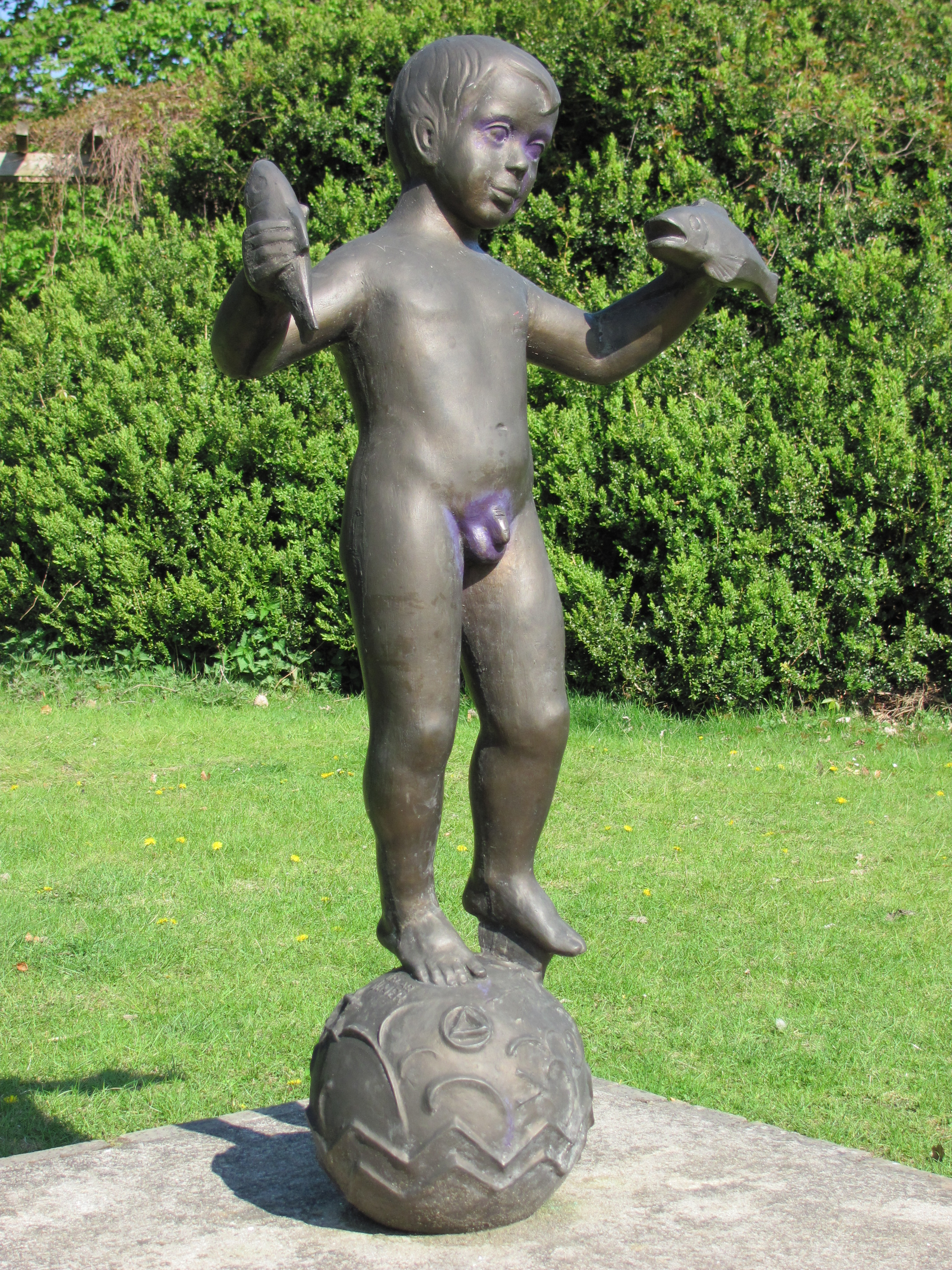
Boy with fishes (1925) by Oscar E. Ulmer

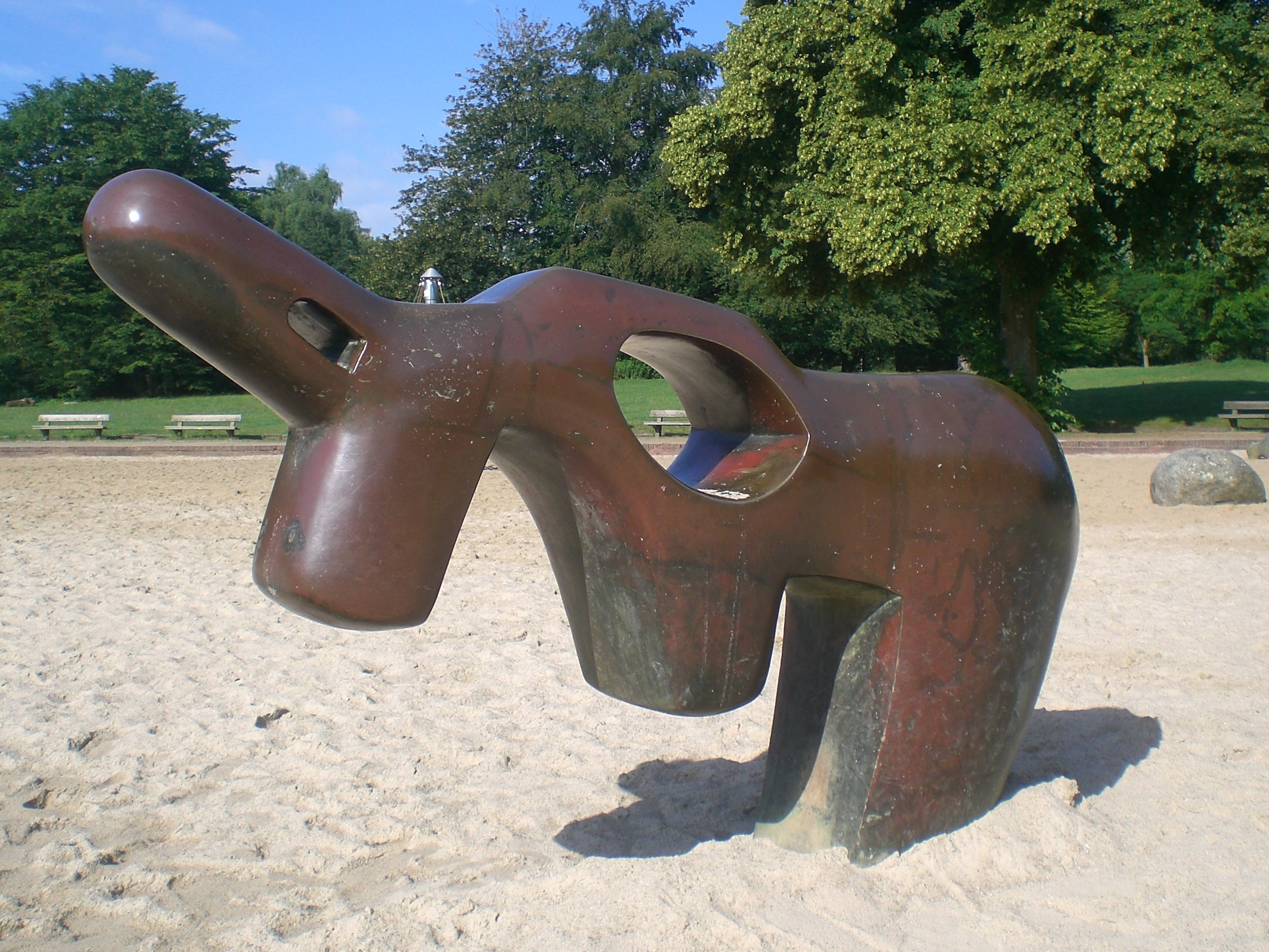
Gargoyle (1930) by Richard Haizmann; original labelled degenerate art and destroyed by the Nazis, replica of 1994

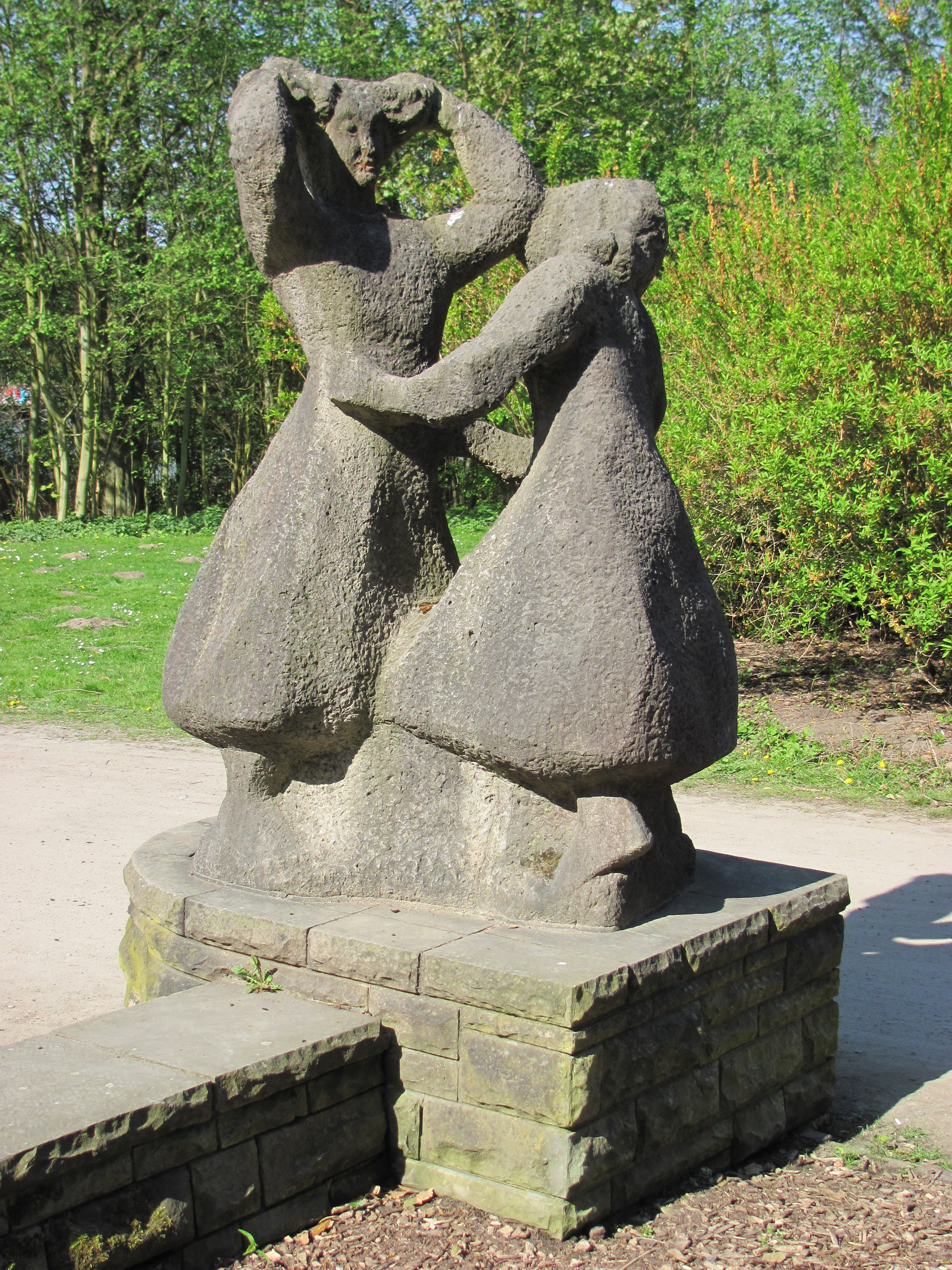
Dancing Girls (1935) by Karl August Ohrt
