= Silesian Planetarium =

Coordinates: 50°17′25.69″N 18°59′29.29″E

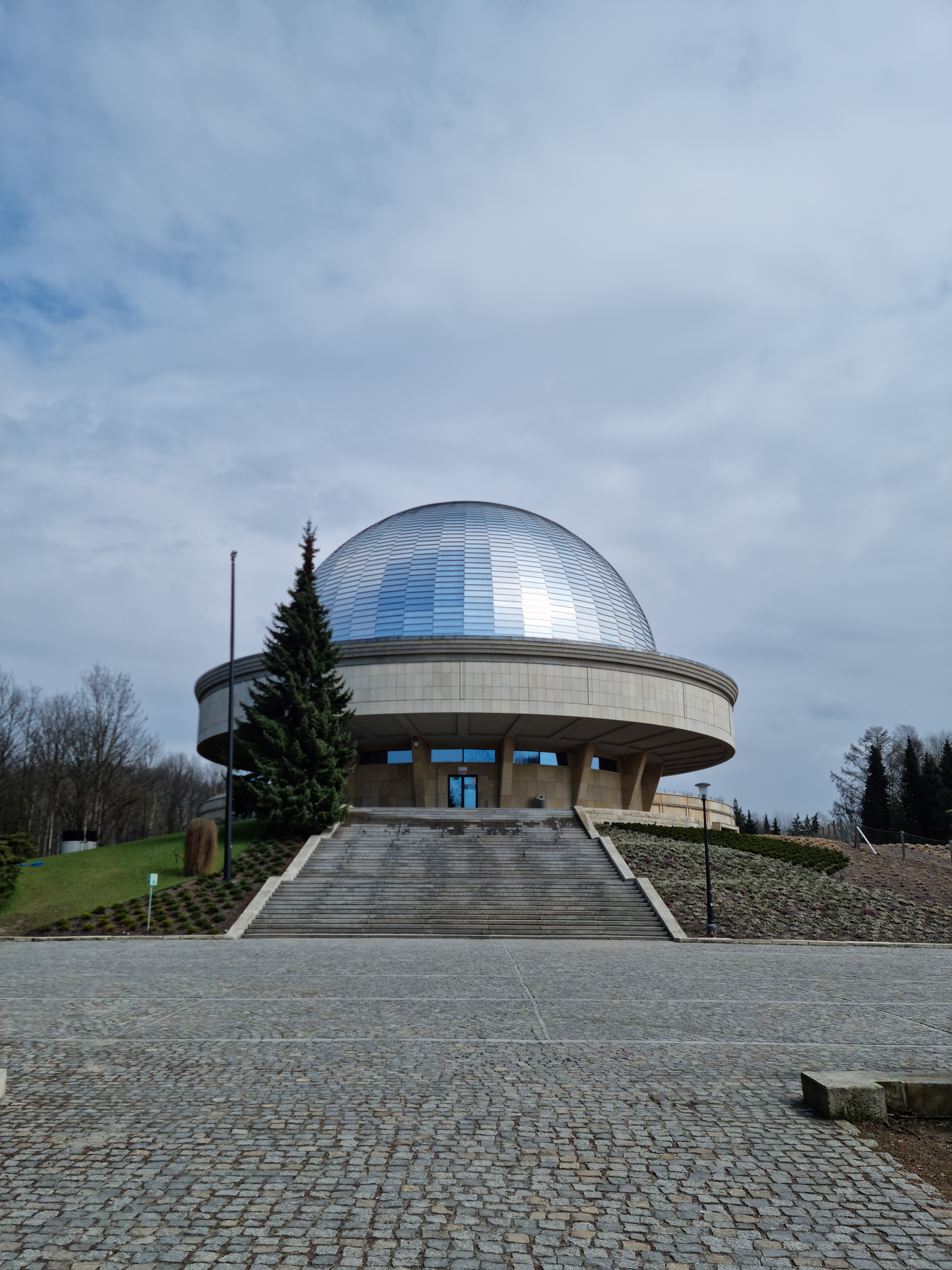
View of the Silesian Planetarium - 2023

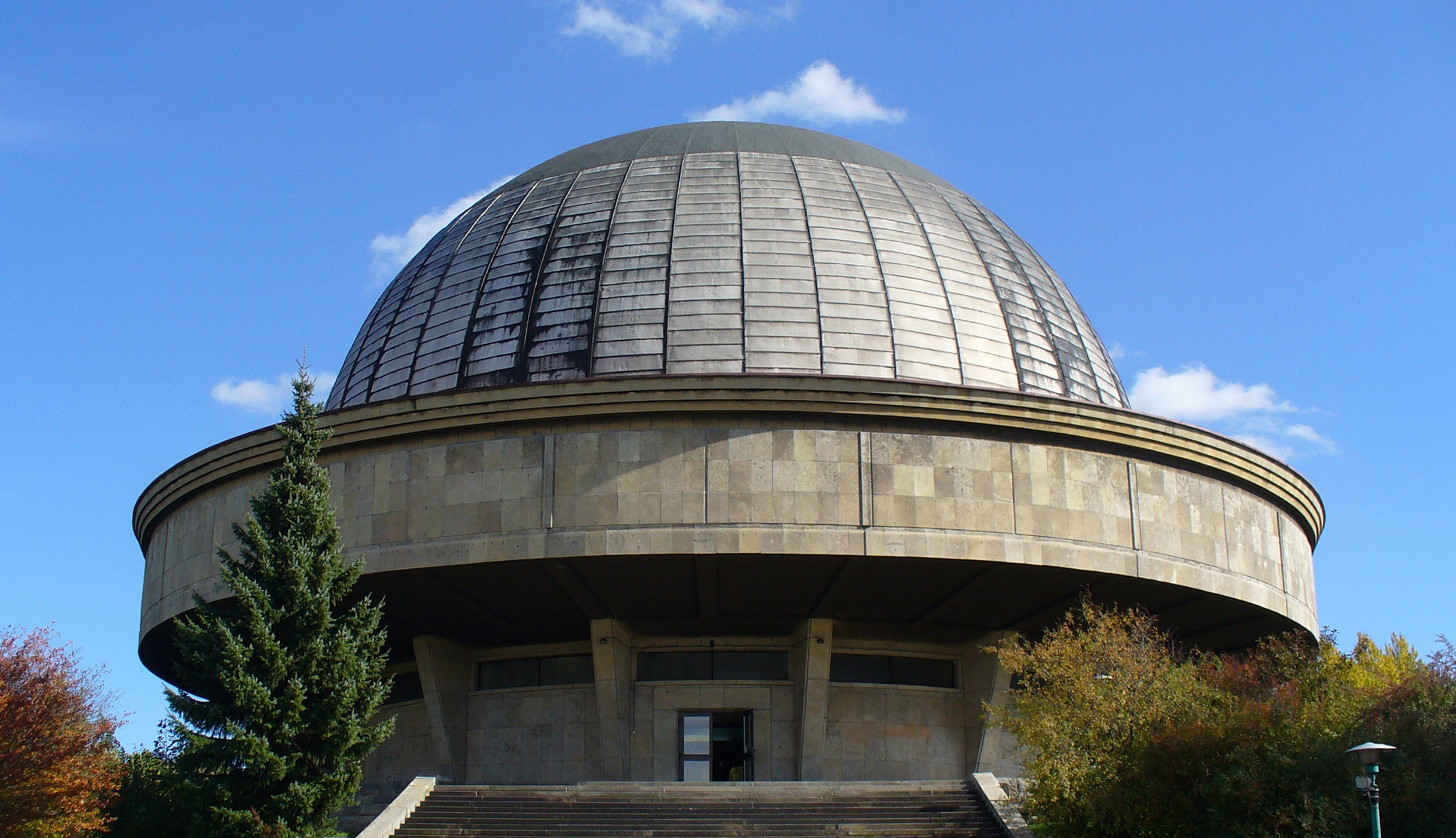
The Silesian Planetarium

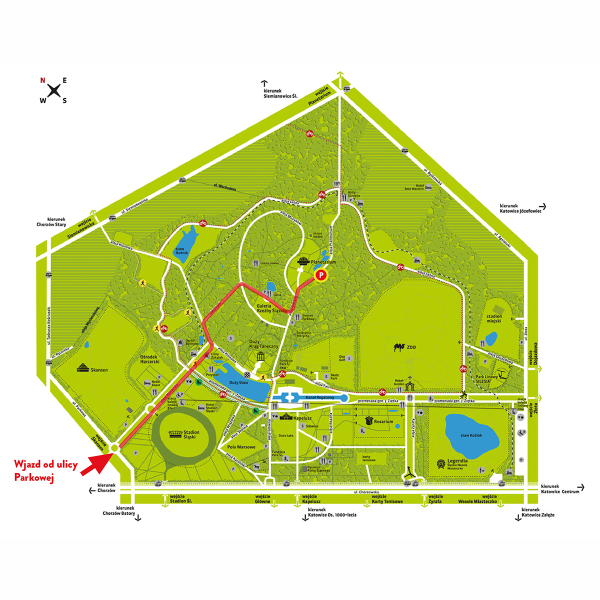
Map of the planetarium grounds

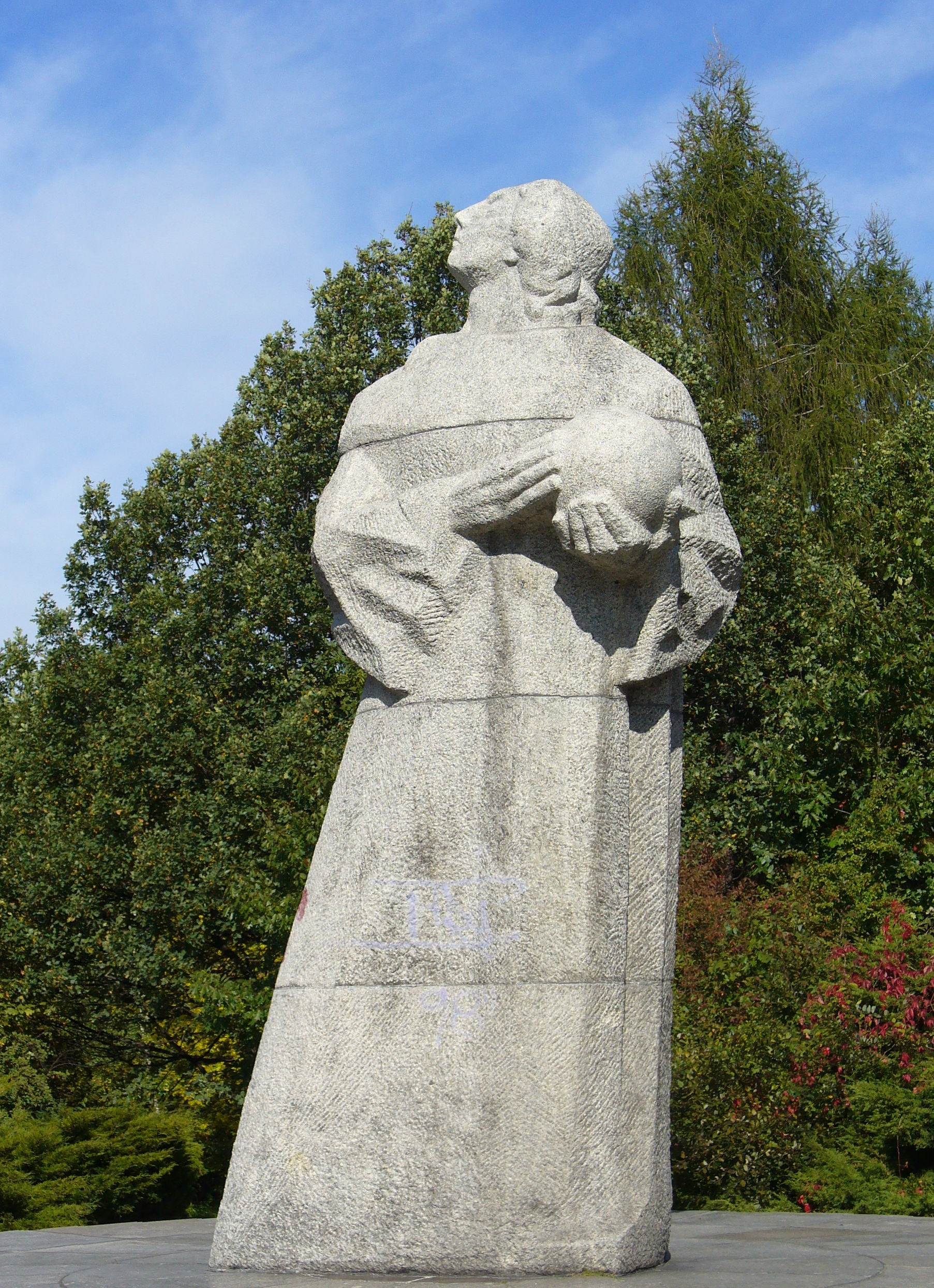
Statue of Copernicus in front of the Silesian Planetarium

The Silesian Planetarium also Silesian Planetarium and Astronomical Observatory (Polish: Planetarium Śląskie Polish: Śląskie Planetarium i Obserwatorium Astronomiczne) is the largest and oldest planetarium in Poland. It was founded on 4 December 1955 to commemorate Nicolaus Copernicus. It is located in the Silesian Park, on the boundary between the Katowice and Chorzów cities in the Metropolis GZM.

== Facilities ==
The Planetarium's 23-meter dome can seat four hundred spectators viewing projections of the sky from both analogue and digital planetarium projectors. It hosts regular public shows on astronomical topics as well as a variety of other events. In 2011 it hosted the fifth International Olympiad on Astronomy and Astrophysics.

The Planetarium's sister astronomical observatory is equipped with a 300-mm diameter refracting telescope (the largest refractor in use in Poland) and a number of smaller instruments. On cloudless days, visitors can view live images of the Sun and, after dusk, a range of celestial objects at a magnification of up to 750 times.

The observatory conducts research on comets and minor planets. The Planetarium has an astronomical library of some 10,000 volumes and, in the courtyard, a large sundial. The corridors host astronomy-related exhibits.

The Planetarium's meteorological and seismological stations conduct regular observations and host educational classes.

== History ==
The Silesian Planetarium, located in Chorzów, Poland, is a renowned educational and scientific facility designed by Kraków architect Zbigniew Solawa. Construction began in July 1953, and it officially opened on December 4, 1955.

The Planetarium's main projection hall can seat around 400 visitors and features a 1,000-square-meter spherical screen. At its center is a Carl Zeiss projector, capable of displaying over 8,000 stars, making it one of the most advanced of its time. The astronomical observatory, launched in 1955, houses Poland's largest refractor telescope with a 30 cm diameter. In subsequent years, a seismological station (1959) and a climatological station (1963) were added.

The Planetarium has played a key role in education, hosting Poland's first Astronomical Olympiad in 1957 and the 5th International Olympiad in Astronomy and Astrophysics (IOAA) in 2011.

Between 2018 and 2022, the facility underwent significant modernization, transforming into a science park. New features include an underground interactive exhibition space and an observation tower. The project was funded by the Silesian Voivodeship and the European Union. Today, the Silesian Planetarium continues to inspire interest in astronomy and the sciences.

== See also ==
- Biały Słoń on Pip Ivan
