= Walther Bauersfeld =

German engineer

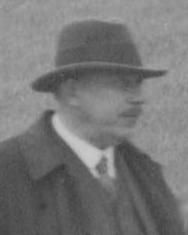
Oct 1930 in Jena

Walther Bauersfeld (23 January 1879 – 28 October 1959) was a German engineer recognized as the inventor of the geodesic dome.

== Life ==
He was employed by the Carl Zeiss Jena, who, on a suggestion by the German astronomer Max Wolf, started work on the first projection planetarium in 1912. This work was stopped by military needs during World War I, but resumed after the war. Bauersfeld completed the first planetarium, known as the Zeiss I model in 1923, and it was initially placed on the roof of a Zeiss building in the corporate headquarters town of Jena. This model projected 4,900 stars, and was limited to showing the sky only from Jena's latitude. Subsequently, Bauersfeld developed the Model 2 with 8,956 stars, and full latitude capability. Over a dozen were installed before World War II again suspended planetarium work. These inter-war planetariums were constructed in Berlin and Düsseldorf in Germany, as well as Rome, Paris, Chicago, Los Angeles and New York. The Zeiss I planetarium in Jena is also considered the first geodesic dome derived from the icosahedron, 26 years before Buckminster Fuller reinvented and popularized this design.

Bauersfeld was awarded the Franklin Institute's Elliott Cresson Medal in 1933 and the Werner von Siemens Ring in 1941.

Post-war, the Zeiss firm, like Germany, divided in two. Bauersfeld remained with the core firm in Jena, East Germany, where after 1953 he developed the ZKP-1 (Zeisskleinplanetarium, the Zeiss Small Planetarium #1). This was intended for small dome planetariums, and while it had latitude change capabilities, the operator had to turn a hand crank to accomplish this. The ZKP-2 added a motor for latitude change. Bauersfeld retired shortly after the ZKP-2 was introduced.

He died on 28 October 1959 in Heidenheim an der Brenz.

== Legacy ==
- The asteroid 1553 Bauersfelda, discovered by Karl Reinmuth in 1940, was named in his honor.
- A monthly newsletter named in Walther Bauersfeld's honor, "Bauersfeld's Folly", was circulated to mostly North American planetariums 1973 to 1983.

== See also ==
- Zeiss projector
