= Hamburg Planetarium =

Most visited star theatre in Germany

- Planetarium Hamburg

- Main entrance of the Hamburg Planetarium at night in February, 2024
- Established: 30 April 1930
- Location: Otto-Wels-Straße 1; 22303 Hamburg, Germany
- Coordinates: 53°35′50″N 10°00′32″E
- Type: planetarium
- Visitors: 300,000 per year
- Director: Dr. Björn Voss
- Owners: Free and Hanseatic City of Hamburg
- Public transit access: Borgweg; Hudtwalckerstraße
- Website: planetarium-hamburg.de

Video tour of the planetarium in 2019

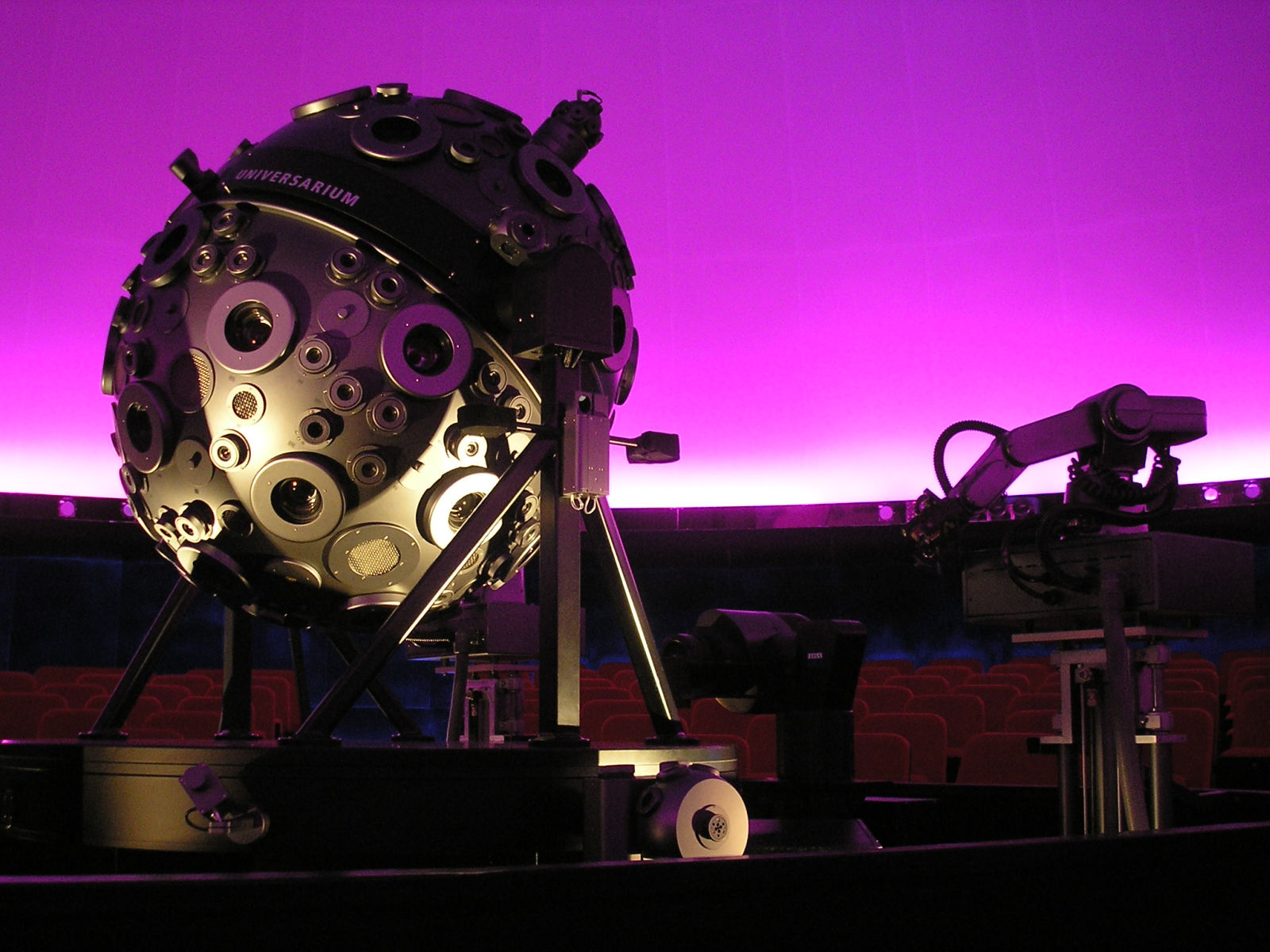
Universarium Mark IX projector and equipment in 2007

Hamburg Planetarium is a planetarium in Hamburg, Germany. Located in the district of Winterhude, it is one of the world's oldest planetariums, and one of Europe's most visited. It is housed in a former water tower at the center of Hamburg Stadtpark.

== History ==
Planetarium Hamburg opened to the public on April 30, 1930. It is situated in an Art Deco water tower, designed by German architect Oskar Menzel and built between 1912 and 1915. However, it was only used as such until 1924, and subsequently converted to a planetarium. At the opening of the planetarium in 1930, a Zeiss Universarium Mark II projector, already acquired by the City of Hamburg in 1925, became the planetarium's centerpiece. Subsequent Zeiss projectors were a Mark IV in 1957, a Mark VI in 1983 and a Universarium IX since 2006.

In 2011 Planetarium Hamburg became one of the first ESO Outreach Partner Organisations (EOPO) of the European Southern Observatory (ESO). The same year, Planetarium Hamburg became the first planetarium in Europe to use fulldome 3D-Stereoscopic technology.

With the start of reconstruction from 3 August 2015, the Planetarium is closed until the end of 2016. The core of the work is the development of the entrance from the outside pedestal on which the water tower stands. From 2017 the new premises and service facilities will provide all visitors of the Hamburg Planetarium improved access, more space, more comfort and advanced conference facilities. In the on city park level emerging areas in the base and the extended, previous lobby level on the first floor will be the new place for gastronomy, shop, events, exhibitions, offices and toilets provided. Access to the planetarium will take place in the future at ground level from the City Park. Two elevators will in future facilitate access to the Star Hall and the popular observation deck, which also will be barrier-free for the first time then. The expansion will bring the added value of an area of approximately 1,200 square meters floor space with them.

== See also ==
- Hamburg Observatory
- List of planetariums
