= Zeiss-Planetarium Jena =

Planetarium in Jena

Coordinates: 50°55′54″N 11°35′13″E

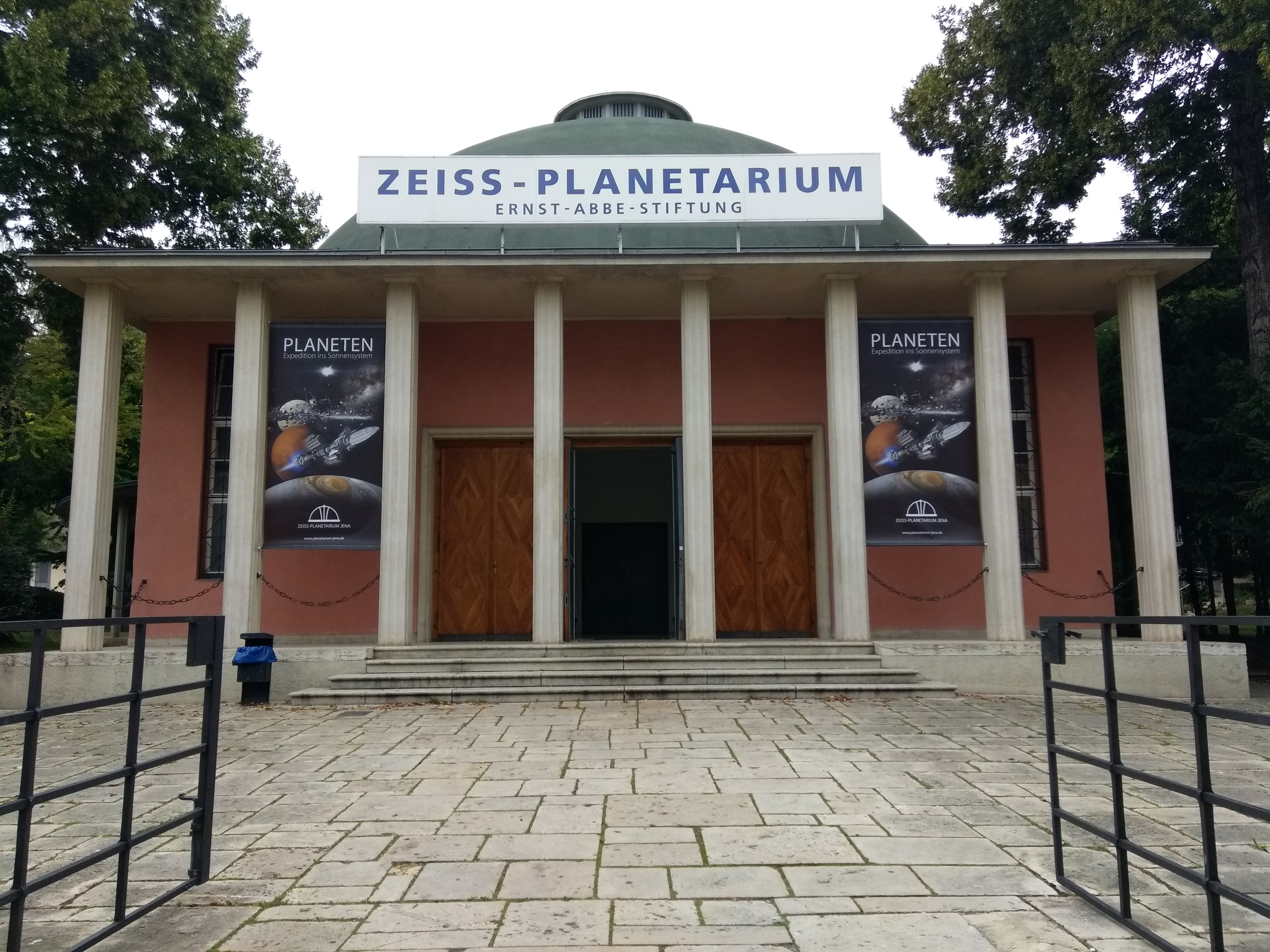
Zeiss-Planetarium, Jena main entrance (2017)

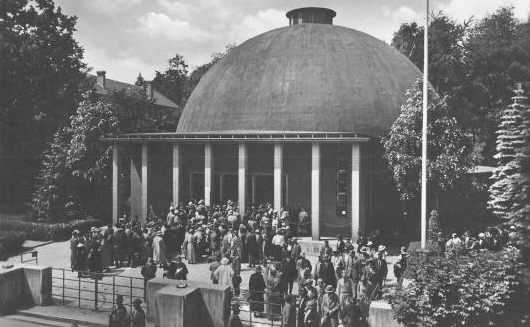
Historic view of the Zeiss-Planetarium in Jena

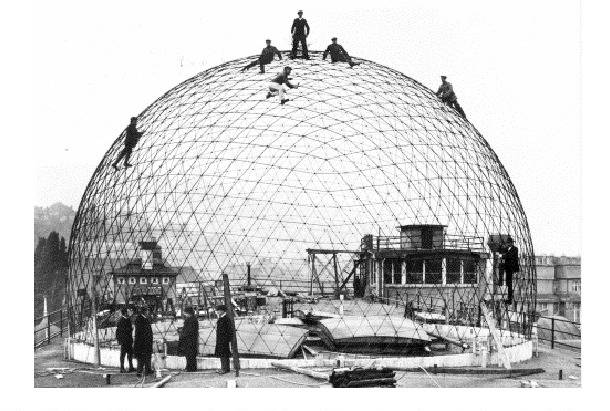
The precursor dome under construction on the roof of the Zeiss factory (ca. 1924).

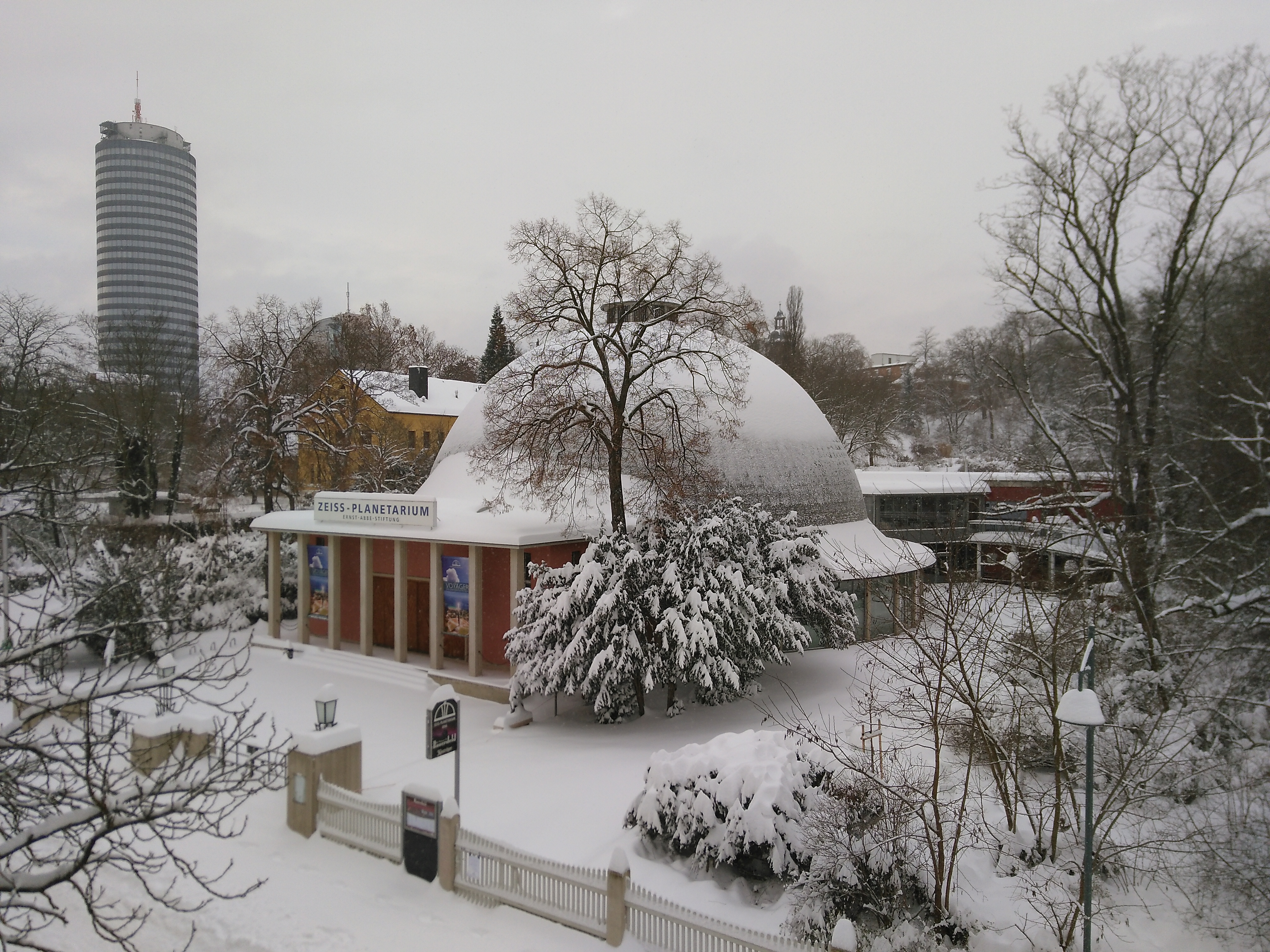
2021

The Zeiss-Planetarium in Jena, Germany, is the oldest continuously operating planetarium in the world.

Engineered by German engineer Walther Bauersfeld, the building was opened on 18 July 1926.

The Zeiss-Planetarium is a projection planetarium; the planets and fixed stars are projected onto the inner surface of a white cupola.

It is owned and operated by the Ernst-Abbe-Stiftung.

== See also ==
- Zeiss projector
