= Planetarium projector =

Device to project images of stars

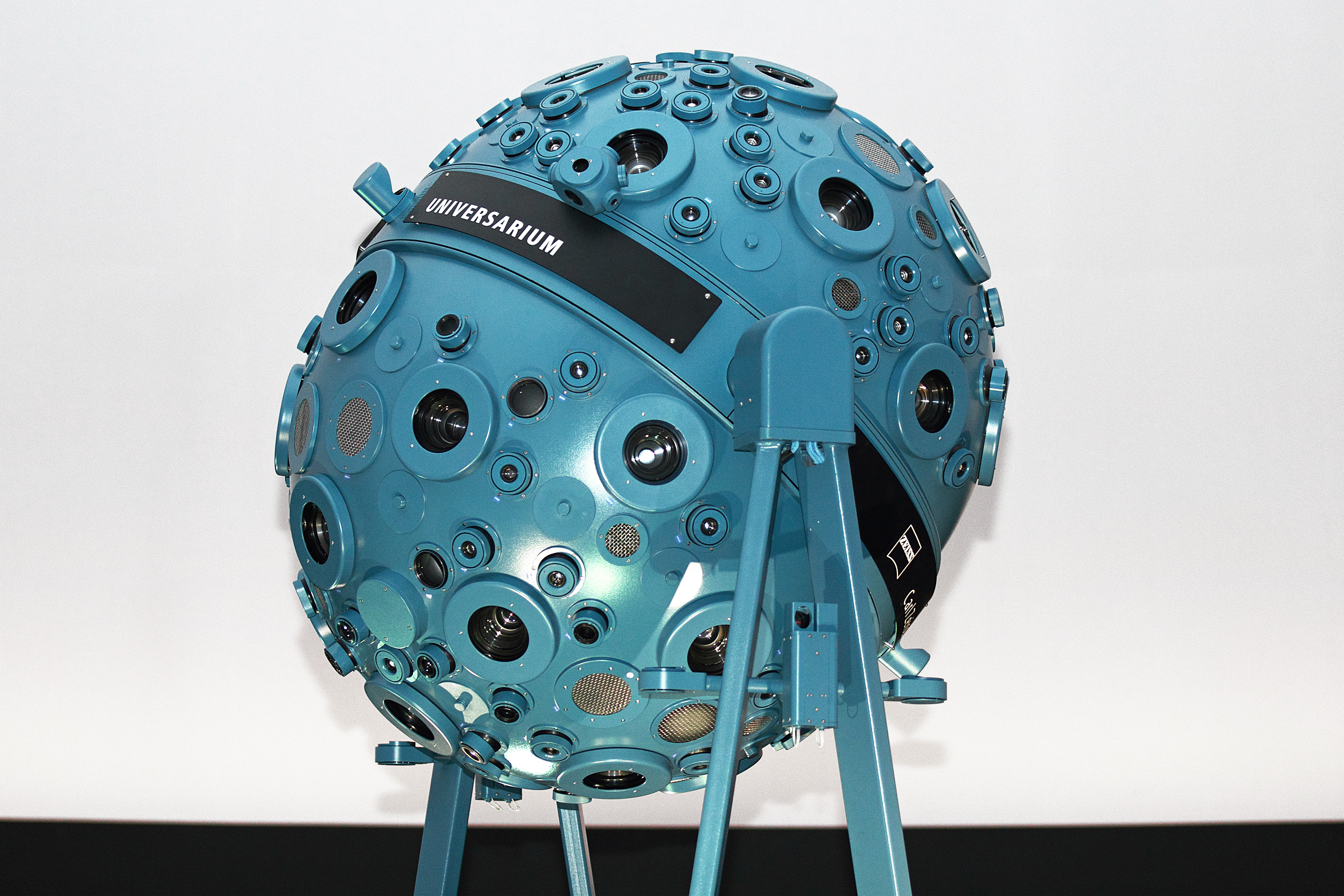
A Zeiss Universarium Mark IX starball projector

A planetarium projector, also known as a star projector, is a device used to project images of celestial objects onto the dome in a planetarium.

Modern planetarium projectors were first designed and built by the Carl Zeiss Jena company in Germany between 1923 and 1925, and have since grown more complex. Smaller projectors include a set of fixed stars, Sun, Moon, and planets, and various nebulae. Larger machines also include comets and a far greater selection of stars. Additional projectors can be added to show twilight around the outside of the screen (complete with city or country scenes) as well as the Milky Way. Still others add coordinate lines and constellations, photographic slides, laser displays, and other images. The OMNIMAX movie system (now known as IMAX Dome) was originally designed to operate on planetarium screens.

Companies that make (or have made) planetarium projectors include Carl Zeiss Jena (Germany), Spitz (US), Goto and Minolta (Japan), Evans & Sutherland (US), Emerald planetariums (Israel) and Ohira Tech (Japan).

== 1960s ==
Zeiss-Jena Universal Projection Planetarium Type 23/6 1 - Constellation Figure Projector (North) 2 - Star Globe (North) 3 - Mechanical shutter of star field projector 4 - Milky Way projector (North) 5 - Planetary projectors (North) 6 - Lattice ring for Sun, Moon and Vertical circle projectors 7 - Horizon circle projector 8 - Planetary projectors (South) 9 - Star Globe (South) 10 - Compass point projector

A good example of a "typical" planetarium projector of the 1960s was the Universal Projection Planetarium type 23/6, made by VEB Carl Zeiss Jena in what was then East Germany. This model of Zeiss projector was a 13-foot (4.0 m)-long dumbbell-shaped object, with 29-inch (740 mm)-diameter spheres attached at each end representing the night sky for the northern and southern hemispheres. Connecting the two spheres was a framework that held nearly 150 individual projectors, including those dedicated to the planets, the Sun, and specific stars.

Each globe held representations of almost 4,500 stars per hemisphere. The "stars" were created by tiny holes that were punched into copper foil, ranging from 0.023 to 0.452 mm in size, the larger holes letting more light get through and thereby creating brighter star images. Two glass plates held this foil between them to create what was called a "star field plate". Each globe was illuminated using a 1,500-watt lamp that was located in its center. A number of aspherical condenser lenses were placed within each globe to focus the light onto the plates. Twenty-three of the most prominent stars had their own projectors, designed to project a small disk instead of pinpoint of light, and were also colored: Betelgeuse and Antares would appear reddish, Rigel and Spica would each have a blue tinge. An image of the Milky Way was created by using drum-type projectors that were studded with unfocused pinprick-sized holes based on photographic images of our galaxy. Specific projectors could imitate the light changes of such variable stars as Algol or Omicron Ceti, and other projectors could produce images of the constellations, of specific historical comets, compass points and other astronomical phenomena. When a particular star or planet dipped below the artificial horizon, a gravity-based mercury-filled shutter would be activated, blocking out the light.

== Recent developments in planetarium projector technology ==
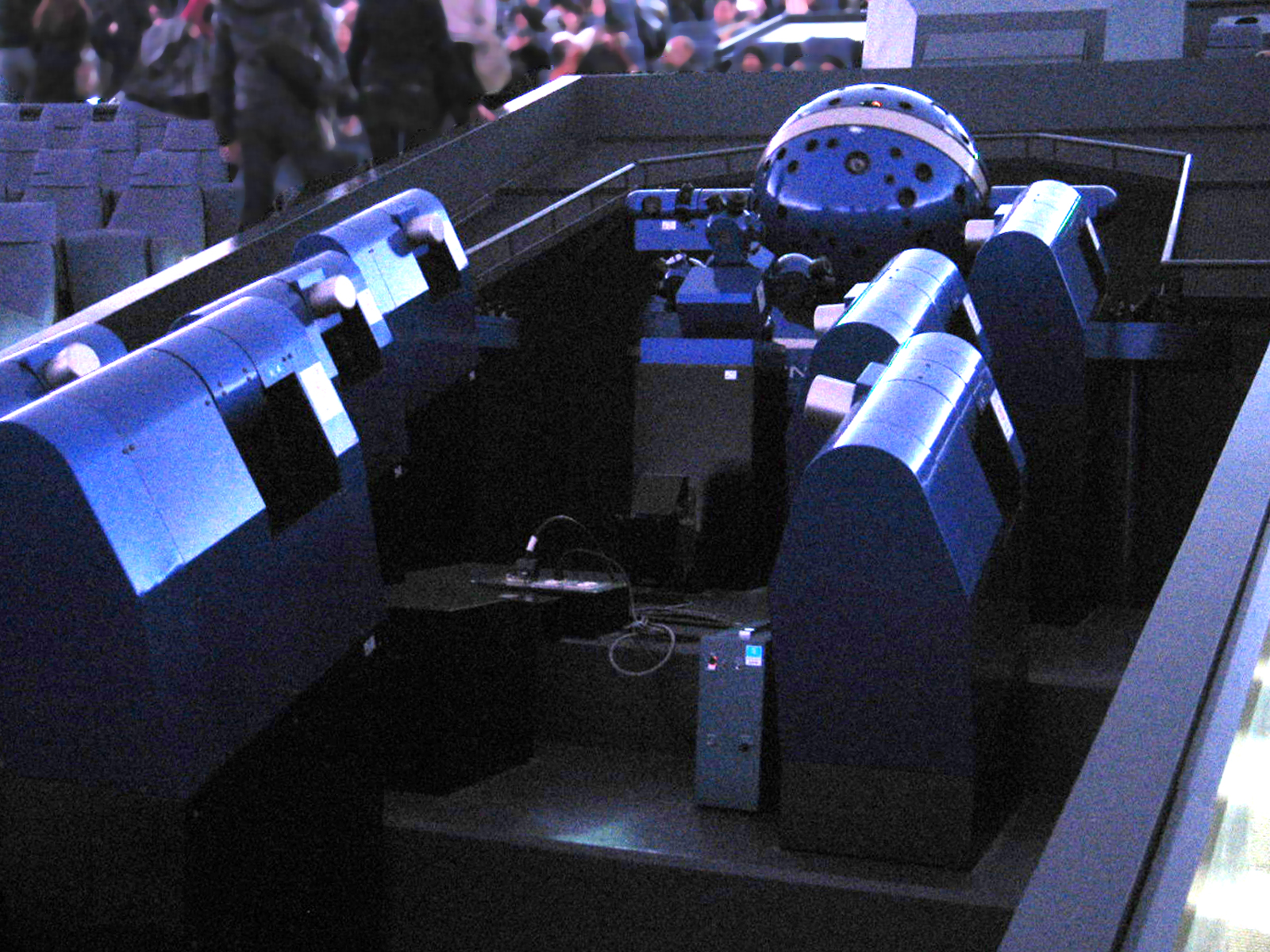
A Konica Minolta Infinium projection system at the Osaka Science Museum, with a starball in the back and the auxiliary projectors for planets in the front. These projectors are complemented by a Virtualium II digital projection system.

Since the release of the Evans & Sutherland Digistar in 1983, a single projector with a fisheye lens was able for the first time to show stars from points of view other than Earth's surface, travel through the stars, and accurately show celestial bodies from different times in the past and future. In more recent years, planetaria — or dome theaters — have broadened their offerings to include wide-screen or "wraparound" films, fulldome video, and laser shows that combine music with laser-drawn patterns. The newest generation of planetariums such as Evans & Sutherland's Digistar 7, Global Immersion's Fidelity or Sky-Skan's DigitalSky Dark Matter, offer a fully digital projection system, in which a single projector with a fisheye lens, or a system of digital video or laser video projectors around the edge of the dome, are used to create any scene provided to it from a computer. This gives the operator tremendous flexibility in showing not only the modern night sky as visible from Earth, but any other image they wish (including the sky as visible from points far distant in space and time). While many projection systems maintain their large single or multiple projectors, other systems cater to portable planetariums, like the Emerald planetariums LITE series, at 42lbs to 62lbs, and the Digitalis Education Solutions, Inc Digitarium Iota and Delta 3, at 20.6 and 33.5 lbs, respectively.

Many planetariums use several, more conventional video projectors with special lenses, software and video servers instead of special planetarium projectors.

== See also ==
- List of planetariums
