= Megastar (projector) =

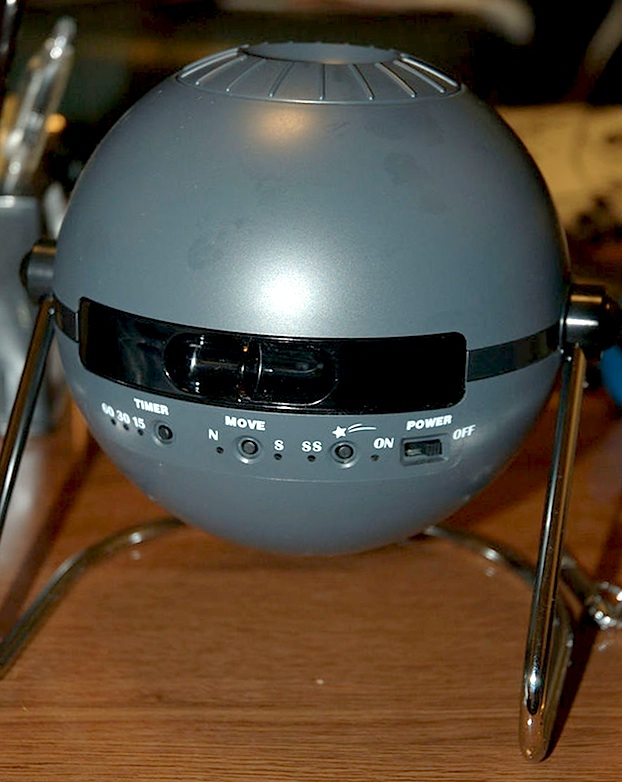
A Sega Homestar home planetarium projector

Megastar (メガスター, Megasutā) is a series of planetarium projectors which was recorded in Guinness World Records in 2004 as the planetarium projector that can project the most number of stars in the world. Megastar was developed by Takayuki Ohira in Kawasaki, Japan in 1998. Since 2005, Sega has been selling the HomeStars, which is a home edition of Megastar.
