= Erwin von Busse =

German writer, artist, art critic, theater director and historian (1885–1939)

- Born: Erwin Oskar Leopold von Busse; 12 January 1885; Magdeburg
- Died: 10 April 1939 (aged 54); São Paulo, Brazil
- Education: Ludwig-Maximilians-Universität München; University of Bern
- Occupations: Writer, painter, theater director, art historian, art critic
- Spouse: Simonette Mathilde Kowarick
- Relatives: Rudolf Maximilian von Busse (brother)
- Writing career
- Pen name: Granand
- Language: German
- Years active: 1912-1939
- Genres: Short stories, art criticism, art history
- Subjects: Erotica, art history, art criticism

Erwin von Busse also known as Granand or Erwin von Busse-Granand (12 January 1885 – 10 April 1939) was a German writer, painter, theater director, art historian and art critic. His 1920 short story collection Das erotische Komödiengärtlein—literally "Erotic Comedy Garden"—featured stories exploring erotic male relationships, which lead to it being banned by courts in both Berlin and Leipzig; it was republished in German in 1993 and in an English translation in 2022 as Berlin Garden of Erotic Delights. As a stage director for several years he worked with some of the most prominent figures of his time and directed the 1919 world premiere of James Joyce's drama Exiles. He devoted himself to painting in his later years, living in exile in Brazil from 1928 onward.

== Biography ==
=== Early years ===
Erwin Oskar Leopold von Busse was born on 12 January 1885 in Magdeburg. His parents were Lieutenant Hugo Maximilian von Busse (1855–1922) and his wife Marie Louise Elisabeth Helene née Weste (1861–1935). He had a brother Rudolf Maximilian von Busse (1886–1957). (Note: Erwin was named for his paternal grandfather and his brother was named for their great-grandfather Rudolf Maximilian von Busse (1783–1864), better known as Maximilian von Busse.)

Erwin von Busse went to school in Magdeburg and Kiel. Beginning in 1898, he attended several military schools, ending with graduation in 1905 from the Prussian military academy in Gross-Lichterfelde. He spent the next two years performing his compulsory military service.

Beginning in 1907, he studied law at the Ludwig-Maximilians-Universität München, changing to art history in 1909. In 1912, he interrupted his studies for a trip to Brazil and a sojourn in Paris.

=== Art criticism ===
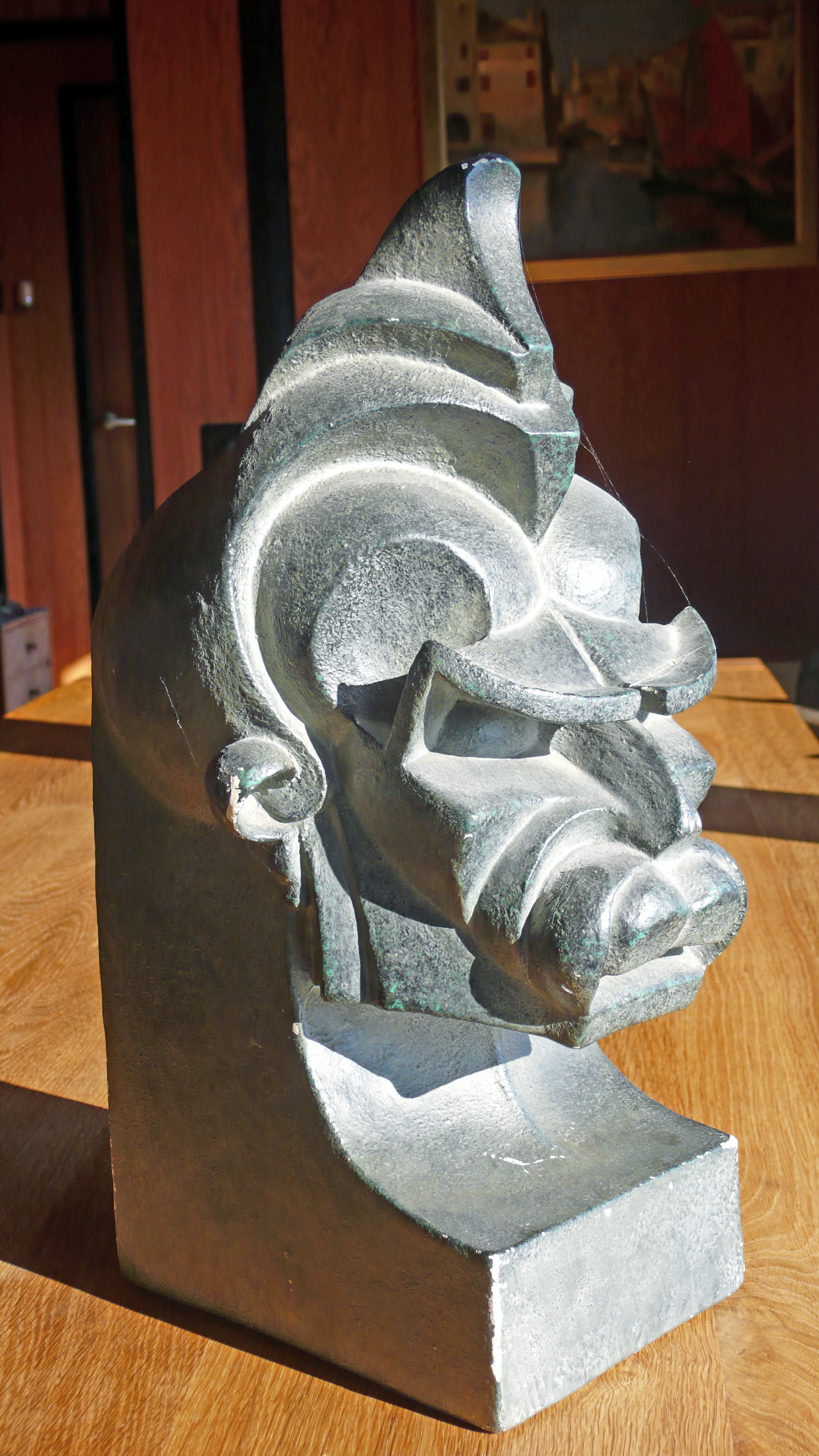
Art piece by von Busse

In 1912, he contributed an essay about Robert Delaunay to the Der Blaue Reiter Almanach. Reproductions of two recent Delaunay works, St. Séverin (1909) and The Window on the City (1911), illustrated the text. This essay has been praised for its "extraordinary insight" into Delaunay, who was soon to prove a critical leader in discovering the principles of expressionist and abstract art. Analyzing a few critical Delaunay canvases, von Busse traced the artist's shift from respect for the physical subject, to fracturing the object into particles formed and colored as "the dynamic needs of the space" require, and finally to excluding all references to the external world so that shape and color become the form and subject of the painting. Delaunay, in von Busse's words, now explores "the problem of space dynamics" without reference to the external world as he searches for the rules of "subjective understanding and representation".

Von Busse returned to his studies before the end of 1912, now at the University of Bern. There he received his doctorate in 1914 with a thesis on Entwicklungsgeschichte des Problems der Massendarstellungen in der italienischen Malerei (The Historical Evolution of the Depiction of the Masses in Italian painting).

=== Theater ===
Von Busse then turned to the theater and before long settled in Berlin, where he edited Die Scene, a theater magazine, in 1917. By that year he had also taken up the position of director and dramaturge at the Deutsches Theater under Max Reinhardt, a dominant figure in the German-language theater. He directed several productions there between 1918–19. In 1919 he directed a revival of Walter Hasenclever's expressionist play The Son (1916), achieving greater success than Reinhardt had with the original production in 1918. (Note: Hasenclever took the role of Fürst Scheitel.)

He moved to Munich and worked for Hermine Körner, who had starred in The Son. There he directed the world premiere of James Joyce's 1918 drama Exiles at the Munich Theater on 7 August 1919. (Note: The Munich production proved to be the world premiere after Joyce failed to find a theater in the UK or US to produce it. His overtures to theaters in Bern and Turin were also rejected. It was published in English on 25 May 1918 and in German on 4 April 1919.)

Other plays he directed included Candida by George Bernard Shaw and Die Soldaten by Jakob Michael Reinhold Lenz. By 1925, he was no longer associated with a theater.

=== Fiction ===
Von Busse adopted the pseudonym Granand to publish Das erotische Komödiengärtlein (Erotic Comedy Garden) in 1920. Its five stories depict a variety of sexually charged encounters between men, with characters that range from military school cadets and dance-hall regulars to a foreign businessman and a burglar. Granand wrote that his garden "has crooked, convoluted, and uncontrolled paths" but "over it all the great, hot sun shines, the melancholy moon passes by, and the innocent stars twinkle." There were two editions: a private edition of 100 copies with six illustrations by Rudolph Pütz (1896–1986) (Note: The illustrations in the private edition were hand colored by Pütz or Granand.) and a public edition of a few thousand copies with a slightly different text and five illustrations and a cover design by Ludwig Kainer (1885–1967). In an enthusiastic review, Der Eigene, a bi-weekly gay newsletter, called the small printing a "luxury edition" and identified the bookstore that was handling sales. (Note: This review gave no indication that a less expensive edition was forthcoming.)

Von Busse wrote with discretion to avoid government censorship. Though the Weimar Republic is now celebrated for its "radical remaking of sexual norms", and its 1919 constitution prohibited censorship in principle, it also permitted statutes to regulate films, printed matter, and public presentations. For example, the film Different from the Others, which argued for the decriminalization of homosexuality, was released in May 1919 and banned nationwide in October 1920. (Note: Screenings were permitted for "private audiences and medical professionals".)

Regional courts in Berlin and Leipzig in 1920 and 1921 banned the distribution of von Busse's collection of stories because of "indecency" and ordered all copies confiscated or destroyed. (Note: A 1922 bibliophile catalog nevertheless listed the public edition of the stories. And a copy that survived was prized enough for artist Marcus Behmer to have bound "in red and gilt morocco" only to have it stolen by someone who could not find a copy for sale.) The banned 1920 edition was not reprinted until 1993. (Note: One of the stories appeared in a gay Swiss magazine in 1938, and other selections have been printed in "various gay magazines".) The first English translation was published in 2022 as Berlin Garden of Erotic Delights; consistent with the 1920 edition, it identifies the author as "Granand". (Note: This English translation is based on the text of the private edition of 1920.)

A second set of stories, this time featuring heterosexual relationships, appeared in 1921 as Liebesmärchen (Lovers' Fairy Tales). With illustrations by Kainer, its stories were "literary imitations of selections from Washington Irving's Tales of the Alhambra" (1832). An attempt to ban this volume failed.

=== Later years ===
In 1925, von Busse contributed a slight volume to an art history series. By this time he was using a composite name, having added his pseudonym to his birth name to become "Erwin von Busse-Granand."

Using that name he immigrated to Brazil in 1928. (Note: An essay he wrote titled "Rio de Janeiro, May 1928" was printed after his death.) In 1931 he took part in the group exhibition Salão Revolucionário (Revolutionary Salon) at the Escola Nacional de Belas Artes in Rio de Janeiro, the first of its annual exhibitions to host modernists.

He became a Catholic in 1933 and in London on 10 April of that year married Simonette Mathilde Kowarick, a wealthy woman and native of Brazil. They had no children. (Note: Von Busse's niece believes that he and his wife emigrated after marrying, likely because she was Jewish.) In Brazil he devoted himself to painting, concentrating on the South American landscape. He taught for a time at the Olinda School in São Paulo.

He died in São Paulo on 10 April 1939. A few months later, Theodor Heuberger mounted a memorial exhibition of von Busse's paintings at his galleries in Rio de Janeiro and São Paulo; the catalog included several illustrations of von Busse's paintings, two essays about Brazil by the artist, and a brief biography that did not mention his short story collections.

=== Works ===
- E. von Busse (1912). "Die Kompositionsmittel bei Robert Delaunay" [Robert Delaunay's Methods of Composition]. Der Blaue Reiter (in German). Munich: Piper.
- Granand (1920). Das erotische Komödiengärtlein [Erotic Comedy Garden] (in German). Berlin: Almanach-Verlag.
- Granand (1921). Liebesmärchen [Lovers' Fairy Tales] (in German). Berlin: Almanach-Verlag.
- Erwin von Busse-Granand (1925). Francesco Guardi und die Kleinmeister des venezianischen Rokoko [Francesco Guardi and the Minor Masters of Venetian Rococo]. Bibliothek der Kunstgeschichte (in German). Vol. 83. Leipzig: E.A. Seemann.

== See also ==
- Expressionism (theatre)
- German Brazilians
- Weimar culture
- Gay literature
