= Joseph Macauley =

Joseph Macauley, sometimes given as Joseph Macaulay, (1 April 1891 – 6 October 1967) was an American actor and singer. A native of San Francisco, he originally trained as a lawyer at the University of California and also studied singing with Henry Bickford Pasmore. In his early acting career he performed with various theatre troupes in Northern California from 1913 to 1915 and was often seen in outdoor amphitheaters in public parks such as the Cushing Memorial Amphitheatre on Mount Tamalpais and the Forest Theater in Carmel. In 1916 he toured in John E. Kellerd's Shakespeare troupe, and then settled in New York City where he trained under George Arliss as a member of The Theatre Workshop in 1916–1917.

Macauley had a lengthy career as a stage actor and singer in New York City. He appeared in plays, musicals, and light operas, and continued to train his baritone singing voice in New York with Estelle Liebling. His professional debut on the New York stage occurred on November 15, 1917 when he had roles in two one act plays that were performed for the grand opening of the Greenwich Village Theatre (GVT). He was a regular performer at the GVT through 1920. In 1921 he made his Broadway debut at the 48th Street Theatre as King Stefan in Gabriela Zapolska's Sonya (original foreign language title Der Zarewitsch). He appeared in more than 40 productions on Broadway over the next 45 years; notably creating parts in original plays by George Bernard Shaw, Eugene O'Neill and John Galsworthy, and appearing in the original casts of musicals created by composers Irving Berlin, George Gershwin, Cole Porter, Richard Rodgers, Frederick Loewe, and Rudolf Friml. His final stage role was the part of Tom Keeney in the original cast of Funny Girl; a role he played on Broadway from 1964 until shortly before his death in 1967.

While mainly a stage actor, Macauley also worked periodically in film and television. He made his film debut in 1930 as Alberto in the United Artists film The Lottery Bride. His best known role on screen was as Ben Fraser, Sr. in the American soap opera From These Roots; a role he took over from the actor Rod Hendrickson in 1961. He portrayed that role in 266 episodes of the series. He also appeared as a guest actor in shows like Naked City and I Spy.

== Early life and career in California ==
The son of James H. Macauley and Carrie Cohn Macauley, Joseph Harper Macauley was born on 1 April 1891 in San Francisco, California. He originally planned on becoming a lawyer, and studied law at the University of California College of the Law, San Francisco. Prior to becoming a professional actor, he performed as an amateur in his native city with the Sequoia Club. He trained as a baritone in San Francisco with Henry Bickford Pasmore; participating in a group recitals of his students in May and October 1914. Later he studied singing with Estelle Liebling, the teacher of Beverly Sills, in New York City.

Macauley began his professional career performing at the Alcazar Theatre in San Francisco. In his early career he was a member of the Players' Club; a theatre troupe active in San Francisco and in Oakland, California. In 1913 he portrayed the farmer William Pargetter in John Masefield's The Tragedy of Nan with the PC. In 1914 he portrayed Fitton in Arthur Wing Pinero's The Amazons with the PC.

In his early career Macauley performed with the theatre troupe of Garnet William Holme (1873–1929) in Northern California; often appearing in amphitheatres in National Parks and other natural settings. Some of his repertoire with this troupe included Petruchio in The Taming of the Shrew, Nick Bottom in A Midsummer Night's Dream, and the title role in Rip Van Winkle. In 1914 he performed the role of the chamberlain Parvatayna in Kalidasa's Shakuntala at the Cushing Memorial Amphitheatre on Mount Tamalpais, and returned as Rip Van Winkle in 1915. He starred in Charles Wakefield Cadman's Sons of Spain at the Forest Theater in Carmel-by-the-Sea, California in 1914.

== Early career on the New York stage ==
In 1916 Macauley performed as a member of a touring Shakespeare troupe helmed by the actor John E. Kellerd (1862–1929). One of his roles with the company was the Prince of Morocco in The Merchant of Venice. In 1917–1918 he studied under George Arliss as a member of The Theatre Workshop, a year-long training program for young actors in New York City which also presented a series of plays that were staged at a variety of community venues such as at theaters on college campuses and at high schools in New York and Connecticut.

Macauley made his professional New York debut at the Greenwich Village Theatre (GVT) in November 1917 as a member of the Washington Square Players in performances of Robert Emmons Rogers' Behind a Watteau Picture and Robert H. Davis's Efficiency; notably performing in the grand opening of that theatre on November 15, 1917. He returned to that theatre in 1918 as Dr. Schou in Hjalmar Bergström's Karen with Fania Marinoff in the title role; The Captain in Eugene O'Neill's Ile; and as the old shepherd Geron in Maurice Hewlett's and Harley Granville-Barker's play Pan and the Young Shepherd. Other roles he performed at the GVT included King Duṣyanta in Kalidasa's Shakuntala (1919), Thomas Houlihan in Lennox Robinson's The Lost Leader (1919), and Norbert in Jacinto Benavente's The Passion Flower (1920).

In 1921 Macauley performed at Broadway's 48th Street Theatre as King Stefan in Sonya, an English language adaptation of Gabriela Zapolska's Der Zarewitsch that was translated from the original Polish by Alexander Wyckoff. He portrayed Dr. Henry Arnold in Lillian Barrett's The Dice of the Gods at the Cort Theatre in Chicago in 1922, and then toured in that part; ultimately playing the role at Broadway's National Theatre in April 1923. Later that year he returned to Broadway to portray the Vizier in Zelda Sears and Harold Levey's musical The Magic Ring at the Liberty Theatre. On December 28, 1923 he originated the role of the Inquisitor, Brother John Lemaître, in the world premiere of George Bernard Shaw's Saint Joan at the Garrick Theatre.

In 1924 Macauley starred alongside Fanny Brice, Oscar Shaw, and Grace Moore in Irving Berlin's fourth annual Music Box Review at the Music Box Theatre. He spent the remainder of the 1920s creating parts in several original plays and musicals on Broadway. These included the roles of Angelo Terrie in E. B. Dewing and Courtenay Savage's Don't Bother Mother (1925, Little Theater); Freman in John Galsworthy's A Bit of Love (1925, 48th Street Theatre); Baron Frederick in Rudolf Friml, Otto Harbach, and Oscar Hammerstein II's The Wild Rose (1926, Martin Beck Theatre), Prince Hussein in Winthrop Cortelyou, Derick Wulff, and Max Simon's musical Kiss Me! (1927, Lyric Theatre); Tony Mustano in Sigmund Romberg's The Love Call (1927, Majestic Theatre); Imre Szabo in Lajos Egri's Rapid Transit (1927, Provincetown Playhouse); Aramis in Friml and P. G. Wodehouse's The Three Musketeers (1928, Lyric Theatre; and Alvarez Romano in George and Ira Gershwin's Show Girl (1929, Ziegfeld Theatre). He also starred as Archibald Grosvenor in the 1927 Broadway revival of the Gilbert and Sullivan opera Patience at Theatre Masque.

== Later stage career ==
In 1930 Macauley created the leading male role of Paul Wilson in the original production of Rudolf Friml's Luana at Hammerstein's Theatre. In 1931 he starred in a series of Gilbert and Sullivan operas with The Civic Light Opera Company at Broadway's Erlanger's Theatre; portraying the roles of Captain Corcoran in H.M.S. Pinafore, Giuseppe Palmieri in The Gondoliers, Archibald Grosvenor in Patience, Strephon in Iolanthe, and the Counsel in Trial by Jury. In 1932 he created the role of Rodney St. Clair in the original production of Irving Berlin and Moss Hart's Face the Music at the New Amsterdam Theatre. In 1933 he returned to Broadway as Dr. Falke in an English language adaptation of Die Fledermaus entitled Champagne, Sec which began its run at the Morosco Theatre. It later transferred first to the Shubert Theatre and then to the 44th Street Theatre.

In 1934–1935 Macauley portrayed Alonzo in the original production of Howard Dietz and Arthur Schwartz's Revenge with Music at the New Amsterdam Theatre. On September 28, 1936 he portrayed General Baron Gourgaud in the United States premiere of R. C. Sherriff's St Helena for the opening the National Theatre's 101st season in Washington, D.C. He stayed with the production when it transferred to Broadway's Lyceum Theatre the following month. His other Broadway appearances in the 1930s included both Judah and The Angel of Death in the world premiere of Kurt Weill's opera The Eternal Road (1937, Manhattan Opera House); both Tony and the Federal Theatre Director in Rodgers and Hart's I'd Rather Be Right (1937, Alvin Theatre); both Captain Jacques and the Prologue in Frederick Loewe, Earle Crooker, and Lowell Brentano's Great Lady (1938, Majestic Theatre); and Captain Wickford in Wilson Starbuck's Sea Dogs (1939, Maxine Elliott's Theatre).

Macauley portrayed a policeman in the 1940 Broadway revival of Ferenc Molnár's Liliom at the 44th Street Theatre. From 1941 to 1943 he performed the role of Julian Watson in Cole Porter's Let's Face It! at the Imperial Theatre. In 1945 he toured with Milton Berle as Colonel Roland Peoples in Robert Wright and George Forrest's Spring in Brazil. In 1946 he appeared at the New Century Theatre as Stephan in Gypsy Lady; a musical which borrowed music from Victor Herbert's The Serenade and Herbert's The Fortune Teller but which contained an original book and new lyrics to those tunes. In 1949 he was a member of S. M. Chartock's Gilbert and Sullivan Company. With that company he performed in a series of works at the Mark Hellinger Theatre; including the title role in The Mikado, Richard (a.k.a. The Pirate King) in The Pirates of Penzance, and Dick Deadeye in H.M.S. Pinafore. He later repeated all three of those roles and the role of George, Earl of Mountararat in Iolanthe at the same theatre in 1952.

In May 1952 Macauley returned to the Music Box Theatre as Friar Francis in Anthony Eustrel's staging of Shakespeare's Much Ado About Nothing with Claire Luce as Beatrice and Eustrel as Benedick. In 1961 he portrayed the role of Lawyer Manson in Sheldon Harnick, Ira Wallach, and David Baker's Off-Broadway musical Smiling the Boy Fell Dead at the Cherry Lane Theatre. He starred in another Off-Broadway musical the following year; portraying Maloney in Bob Larimer's King of the Whole Damn World at the Jan Hus Playhouse. His final stage role was the part of Tom Keeney in the original cast of Funny Girl; a role he played on Broadway at the Winter Garden Theatre from 1964 until shortly before his death in 1967.

In addition to his work in New York, Macauley appeared regularly with the St. Louis Municipal Opera from 1933 to 1942. From 1945 to 1950 he appeared annually in the summer season at the Bucks County Playhouse. In 1950 he spent ten weeks performing at the State Fair of Texas in Dallas. He appeared in a season of musicals at the Overton Park Shell in Memphis in 1951. He was a regular performer at the Starlight Theatre in Kansas City, Missouri; appearing in a total of 86 roles at that theatre from 1953 to 1963. He also performed with the Detroit Civic Light Opera for seven seasons.

== Film and television ==
In 1930 Macauley made his film debut as Alberto in the United Artists film The Lottery Bride which starred Jeanette MacDonald and John Garrick. He had a small part in the Fatty Arbuckle and Shemp Howard film Tomalio (1933). On November 10, 1954 he portrayed the bartender in a television version of Panama Hattie broadcast live on the CBS anthology series The Best of Broadway which starred Ethel Merman in the title part. He worked as a guest actor on television shows from the mid 1950s into the early 1960s; making appearances on the programs Naked City, Kraft Television Theatre, The Imogene Coca Show, and I Spy. His best known role on screen was as Ben Fraser, Sr. in the American soap opera From These Roots; a role he took over from the actor Rod Hendrickson in 1961. He portrayed that role in 266 episodes of the series.

== Personal life ==
Macauley was married to Lillian Marie Aune. He died on 6 October 1967 in New York City.
