= International Planetarium Society =

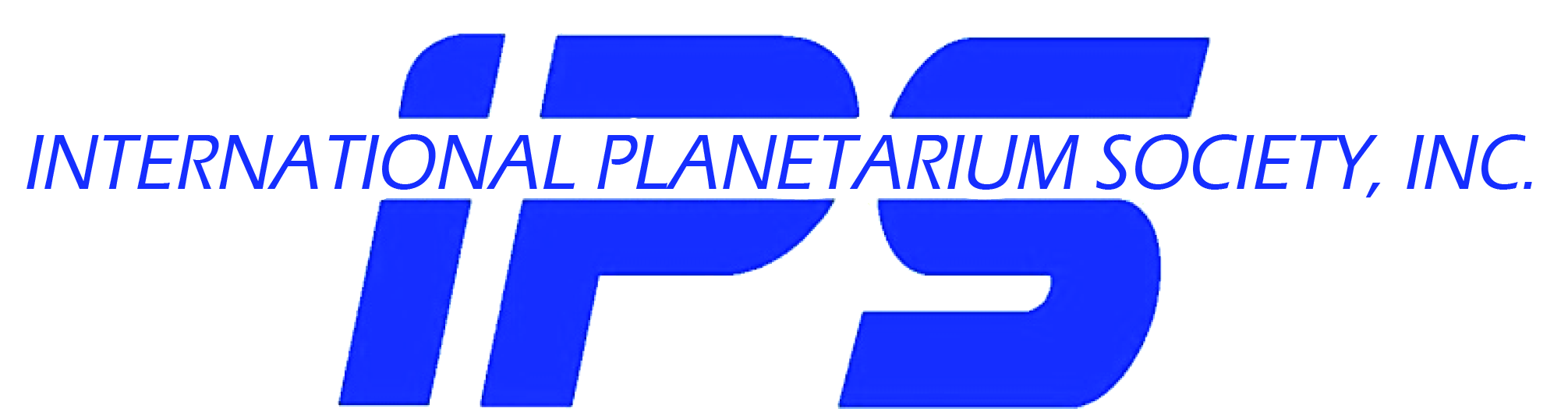
Logo of the IPS

The International Planetarium Society, Inc. (IPS) is the global association of planetarium professionals. Its more than 600 members come from 42 countries around the world. They represent schools, colleges and universities, museums, and public facilities of all sizes, including both fixed and portable planetariums. The primary goal of the IPS is to encourage the sharing of ideas among its members through conferences, publications, and networking. By sharing their insights and creative work, IPS members become better planetarians.

IPS membership is open to anyone interested in planetariums. Members include directors, teachers, informal educators, technicians, writers, artists, media specialists, digital artists and producers, presenters, vendors, scientists, students, and sponsors and friends of the planetarium dome and its starry sky. Although planetariums can be part of school district curriculum, either at an in-district dome or through field trips, they also serve as sites and sources of life-long learning and Science, Technology, Engineering, and Mathematics (STEM) education.

More than 20 regional and national planetarium associations from around the world are affiliated with IPS. The representatives report to a board composed of elected members from 6 geographic regions, the number of representatives determined by the number of IPS members within that region. This board and the elected officers make up the Executive Council, the ruling body of the organization.

== Affiliates ==
Affiliate	Website
African Planetarium Association (APA)	
Association of Brazilian Planetariums (ABP)	www.planetariodorio.com.br/
Association of Dutch Speaking Planetariums (PLANed)	www.astronomie.nl/
Association of French-Speaking Planetariums (APLF)	www.aplf-planetariums.org
Association of Mexican Planetariums (AMPAC)	
Association of Spanish Planetariums (APLE)	
Australasian Planetarium Society (APS)	apsplanetarium.com
British Association of Planetaria (BAP)	planetaria.org.uk
Canadian Association of Science Centres (CASC)	www.canadiansciencecentres.ca
Chinese Planetarium Society (CPS)	
European/Mediterranean Planetarium Association (EMPA)	
Italian Association of Planetaria (IAP)	www.planetari.org
Japan Planetarium Association (JPA)	planetarium.jp
Nordic Planetarium Association (NPA)	
Russian Planetarium Association (RPA)	www.apr.planetariums.ru
Society of the German-Speaking Planetariums (GDP)	www.gdp-planetarium.org
United States: Great Lakes Planetarium Association (GLPA)	glpa.org
United States: Great Plains Planetarium Association (GPPA)	www.spacelaser.com/gppa
United States: Middle Atlantic Planetarium Society (MAPS)	www.mapsplanetarium.org
United States: Pacific Planetarium Association (PPA)	sites.csn.edu/planetarium/PPA
United States: Rocky Mountain Planetarium Association (RMPA)	
United States: Southeastern Planetarium Association (SEPA)	www.sepadomes.org
United States: Southwestern Association of Planetariums (SWAP)	sites.google.com/site/wacplanetaria/home/swap-southwest-association-of-planetariums?authuser=0

== Membership ==
IPS members receive the quarterly journal Planetarian; attend biennial conferences on even-numbered years; receive conference proceedings, and special publications. Member-only benefits are available through the IPS website at ips-planetarium.org, where interested persons also can join.

== Publications ==
Planetarian is the IPS quarterly membership journal and an important member benefit. In addition to regular features and columnists, it seeks research articles on any aspect of planetarium education (that will be professionally reviewed upon request), the history of planetariums, technological developments, and much more.

Also available:

- IPS Directories: worldwide listing of planetariums and resources
- Conference Proceedings: papers and workshops presented at the biennial conferences
- Special Publications and Reports: handbooks and resources

== Structure ==
Elected officers are president, president-elect, past-president, secretary, and treasurer. The officers, along with representatives from the affiliate organizations, make up the Executive Council, the ruling body of the organization.

The current executive officers are:

- President, Michael McConville
- President-Elect, Dr.Shannon Schmoll
- Past President, Mark SubbaRao
- Secretary, Derek Demeter
- Treasurer, Mike Smail

All positions are volunteer.

== History ==
The genesis of what was to become the International Planetarium Society began with a meeting of planetarium educators in 1958 at the Cranbrook Institute in Michigan. Sponsored by the National Science Foundation (NSF), about 100 delegates from 67 facilities attended. The conference's proceedings were published as Planetaria and Their Uses for Education.

Another meeting was sponsored by the NSF in 1960, this time in Cleveland, Ohio, and resulted in Planetariums and Their Uses for Education, Volume 2. At this meeting those attending voted to initiate a national planetarium association called the American Association of Planetarium Operators, but nothing came out of the action.

Regional associations of planetarium educators formed in the 1960s, resulting in the forming of GLPA, MAPS, SWAP, PPA, RMPA, and SWAP, and PAC was formed in Canada.

More than 300 planetarians gathered in 1970 at the Abrams Planetarium at Michigan State University in East Lansing at a meeting called CAPE - the Conference of Planetarium Educators. At this meeting the decision was made to organize a North American planetarium association and publish a journal. By-laws for the International Society of Planetarium Educators were approved in 1971, and the journal, Planetarian, began in 1972. Paul Engle from the University of Arkansas at Little Rock Planetarium became the first president, and the first editor was Frank C. Jettner from the Department of Astronomy at the State University of New York at Albany. Among the articles in the first issue was "Science and Communication" by Isaac Asimov.

== Early Planetarians ==
The planetarium field's earliest members were those who invented and modified the equipment used to project the stars onto the dome. Among them are

- Oskar von Miller, Bavarian entrepreneur, who founded the Deutsch Museum in Munich and wanted to show the starry sky in his Museum.
- Walther Bauersfeld and Rudolf Straubel, for their development of the Zeiss 1 model opto-mechanical projector in 1923
- Armand Spitz, who developed an early inexpensive opto-mechanical projector in 1946
- Richard H. Emmons, who helped establish more than 23 planetariums

== Awards ==
The highest award given by IPS is the Service Award, started in 1982. This award is bestowed, from time to time, by the Society upon an individual or institution whose presence and work in the planetarium field has been, through the years, an inspiration to the profession and its members.” Since 1982 there have been 24 people awarded with the IPS Service Award.

Similarly, the IPS Technology and Innovation Award is given by the Society, from time to time, upon an individual whose technology and/or innovations in the planetarium field have been, through the years, used or replicated by other members and/or other planetariums.” The award began in 2009 and 6 persons have been recognized.

Deserving IPS members also may be named a Fellow of the Society. To be named, a member must have continuous active membership in good standing in IPS for at least five years and substantial contributions in at least two of the following respects:

- Serving IPS in effective office, diligent and/or devoted committee work, and the organization of conferences and meetings.
- Relevant and significant publications and/or conference presentations.
- Cooperation with professional societies, organizations and groups which bring attention to the importance of planetariums’ existence.
- The development of new methods in the planetarium field.

== See also ==
Planetarium
