= Armand Spitz =

American planetarium designer (1904–1971)

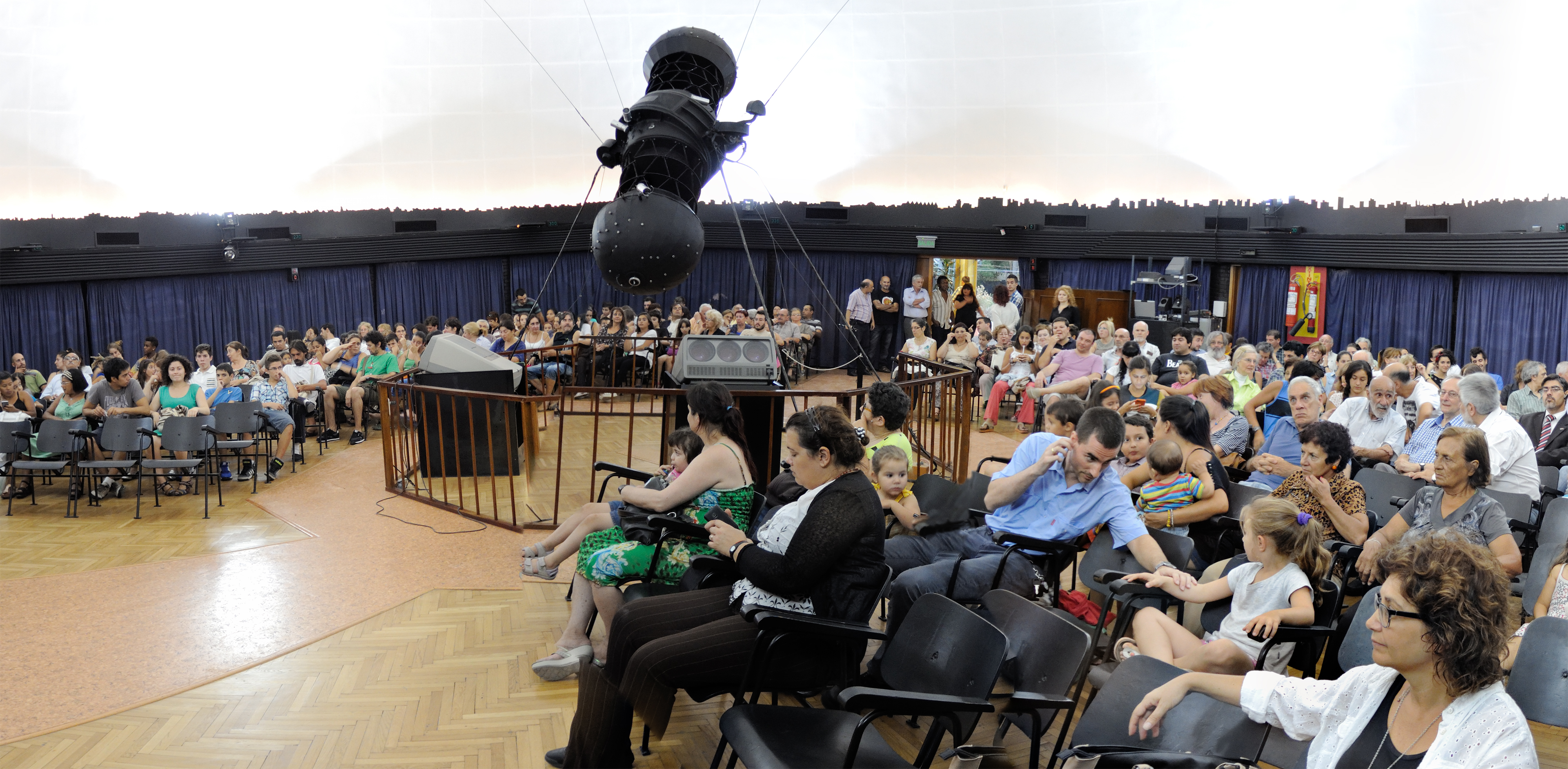
Spitz Model B projector in use at the Planetarium "Agrimensor Germán Barbato" in Montevideo, Uruguay in 2015 (replaced in 2019)

Armand Neustadter Spitz (July 7, 1904 – April 14, 1971) was an American planetarium designer.

== Biography ==
Armand Spitz, the son of Louis Spitz and Rose (Neustadter), was born in Philadelphia, Pennsylvania and was educated at the University of Pennsylvania and the University of Cincinnati, without receiving a degree from either. In 1926 he began working as a journalist, and within two years purchased a newspaper in Haverford, Pennsylvania. This went bankrupt in 1934, and Spitz traveled to France, discovering an interest in astronomy on the voyage to Europe. On his return to the United States, he became a lecturer on astronomical topics at Haverford College. As a side effort he made a 1-foot-diameter (0.30 m) papier-mache model of the Moon, which is on display to this day at the Academy of Natural Sciences in Philadelphia.

Spitz became a volunteer at the new Fels Planetarium in Philadelphia, doing publicity, but soon was allowed to do planetarium lectures. He also created a series of radio programs in which he covered scientific topics, with an emphasis on astronomy. His first book, The Pinpoint Planetarium, appeared in 1940. The first half of the book described the sky and legends attached to it. The last half of the book contained star charts to be punched out and held in front of lamps, projecting stars in their proper relationships onto a wall or other smooth clear surface.

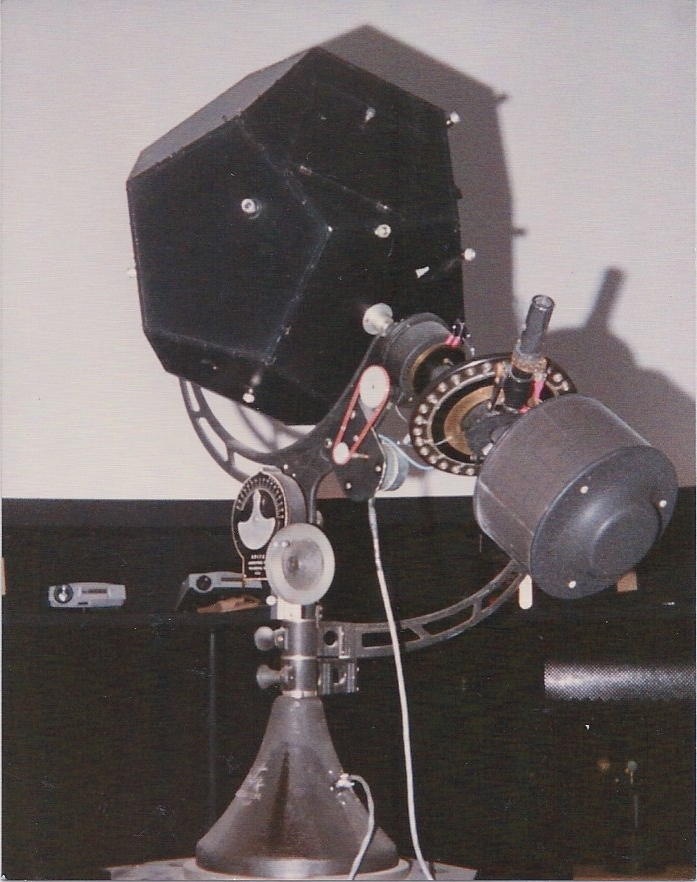
Spitz dodecahedron planetarium projector (1953)

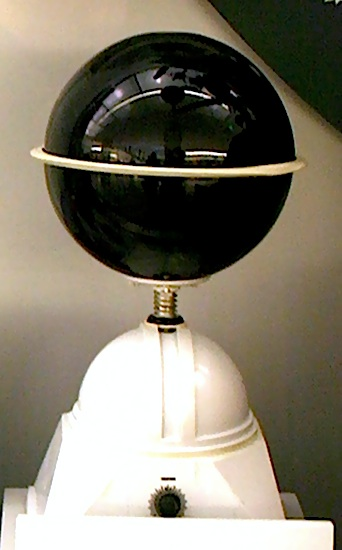
A Spitz Junior home planetarium projector. About a million units were produced between 1954 and about 1972.

Only five planetariums existed in the United States before 1940. Concerned that the only planetariums then available were so expensive that few institutions could have them and few people would live near enough to visit, in 1947 Spitz completed design work on a very inexpensive planetarium model. The main problem, he discovered, was that creating a globe for stellar projection was very complex and expensive. Spitz used a dodecahedron as the "globe" equivalent for his star projector, a suggestion from Albert Einstein.

Following a demonstration at an astronomical conference at the Center for Astrophysics | Harvard & Smithsonian, Spitz received considerable publicity, and began marketing his Model A planetarium for $500. These were sold to the various American military academies, small museums, schools, and even to King Farouk of Egypt.

Within a few years, Spitz introduced the model A-1, which incorporated the Sun, Moon, and five naked eye planets, still using the dodecahedron shape for the star projector. Later a model A-2 came out, projecting more stars (the model A only gave stars brighter than magnitude 4.3). Just at the time that Sputnik caused the United States government to provide considerably enhanced funding for science education, Spitz produced his model A3P. This had a spherical star projector, and mechanized motions for the Sun, Moon and planets, and lunar phases. Well over a thousand of this model were ultimately sold, and in fact, when the Spitz company stopped making this model for a few years, had to bring it back due to continuing demand.

By 1964 Spitz estimated that 300 to 400 planetariums existed in the United States. His company was developing the Space Transit Planetarium, a model with additional motion capabilities and more stars, when he suffered the first of a series of strokes in 1967. He went into semi-retirement after this, and died in Fairfax, Virginia.

== Projector models and advances ==
The A Series As noted, Spitz wanted to create a projector more affordable than the German Zeiss "all optical" projectors. Thus, all of his projectors used large "star balls" that relied on the pinhole lens principle, where star images became smaller (more realistic) as the starlight source (in center of the star ball) was more distant from the star-ball surface. Larger holes drilled into the star ball resulted in larger dots on the dome; thus practically all such projectors used lenses for the larger holes (brighter stars) to condense the dot. The earlier mentioned A series used a dodecahedron star "ball" for easier manufacture. Cherokee, Iowa had an A-1 in service from 1951, with Spitz helping with the opening, until a major digital renovation in 2016 (i.e. retired at 65 years). One improvement were additional, dimmer, stars.

The A3/A3P Series used a true 18" diameter "star sphere" and vastly improved planet projectors that included motions at the proper orbital tilts and retrograde motion via his elegant "planet analogs", that is, analog computers. It also had a driven precessional axis and auxiliary projectors for a projected orrery and a simple meteorite projector. Some could be mounted on an elevator to accommodate other presentation modes. These models originally used an incandescent bulb for starlight source, which produced fuzzy images resembling the glowing filament.

The A4 Series had a better starlight source: a unique xenon-arc lamp topped with a fisheye lens for dispersal across the top half of the starball. Due to the 180° limitation, the power-supply/lamp/lens assembly was mounted on leveling gimbals and incorporated a horizon cutoff mask to avoid projecting below-horizon stars. Another improvement is that control voltages were no longer at line (120VAC) levels, but at low voltages. It also improved the RA and declination axes projector, switching to optical projectors. It also had an azimuthal drive so that the star field could be rotated to the part of the dome facing patrons, avoiding neck-craning.

The Model B departed from his earlier designs, now using two very large star hemispheres in the Zeiss "dumbbell" configuration. These projectors were designed for large planetarium domes. Only 3 were installed, hanging from cables rather than on a large mount (U.S. Air Force Academy, Flint, MI, and Montevideo, Uruguay).

The Model C Spitz projector was patterned after the Model B but smaller, to be used under a 40 foot dome. Only 1 was built for the Minneapolis Planetarium in Minnesota.

The 512 Series resembled the A4, but with a major advancement: use of digital control voltages to the projector. This enabled the use of programmed sequences.

The STP Models The Space Transit Planetarium (variants in Miami, FL, Kansas City, and East Lansing, MI) used digital computers to move planets to different positions. As the name implies, the STP's could simulate POVs from any location within the Solar System.

== Honors ==
- Doctor of Science, honoris causa, from Otterbein College, 1956
- President, Rittenhouse Astronomical Society
- Organizer of Project Moonwatch
- Editor, American Weatherman
- Editor, Weatherwise
- Editor, The Pointer
- Editor and Publisher, Review of Popular Astronomy, 1958-1969
- The outer main-belt asteroid 10996 Armandspitz, discovered by American astronomer Schelte Bus at the Californian Palomar Observatory in 1978, was named in his memory on 30 January 2010 (M.P.C. 68446).

== Partial bibliography ==
- Armand N. Spitz, The Pinpoint Planetarium. Henry Holt and Company, New York, 1940.
- Armand N. Spitz Dies, Designed Planetariums; Philadelphia Evening Bulletin, April 17, 1971.
- Observers Plan Satellite Posts, The New York Times, June 10, 1958, page 38
- Armand N. Spitz, Planetarium Inventor; Charles Federer, Sky & Telescope, June 1971, page 354
- Armand Spitz -- Seller of Stars - International Planetarium Society
- US 2632359, Spitz, Armand N., "Planetarium", published 1953-03-24
