= Camp des Milles =

French internment camp during WWI

- Concentration camp
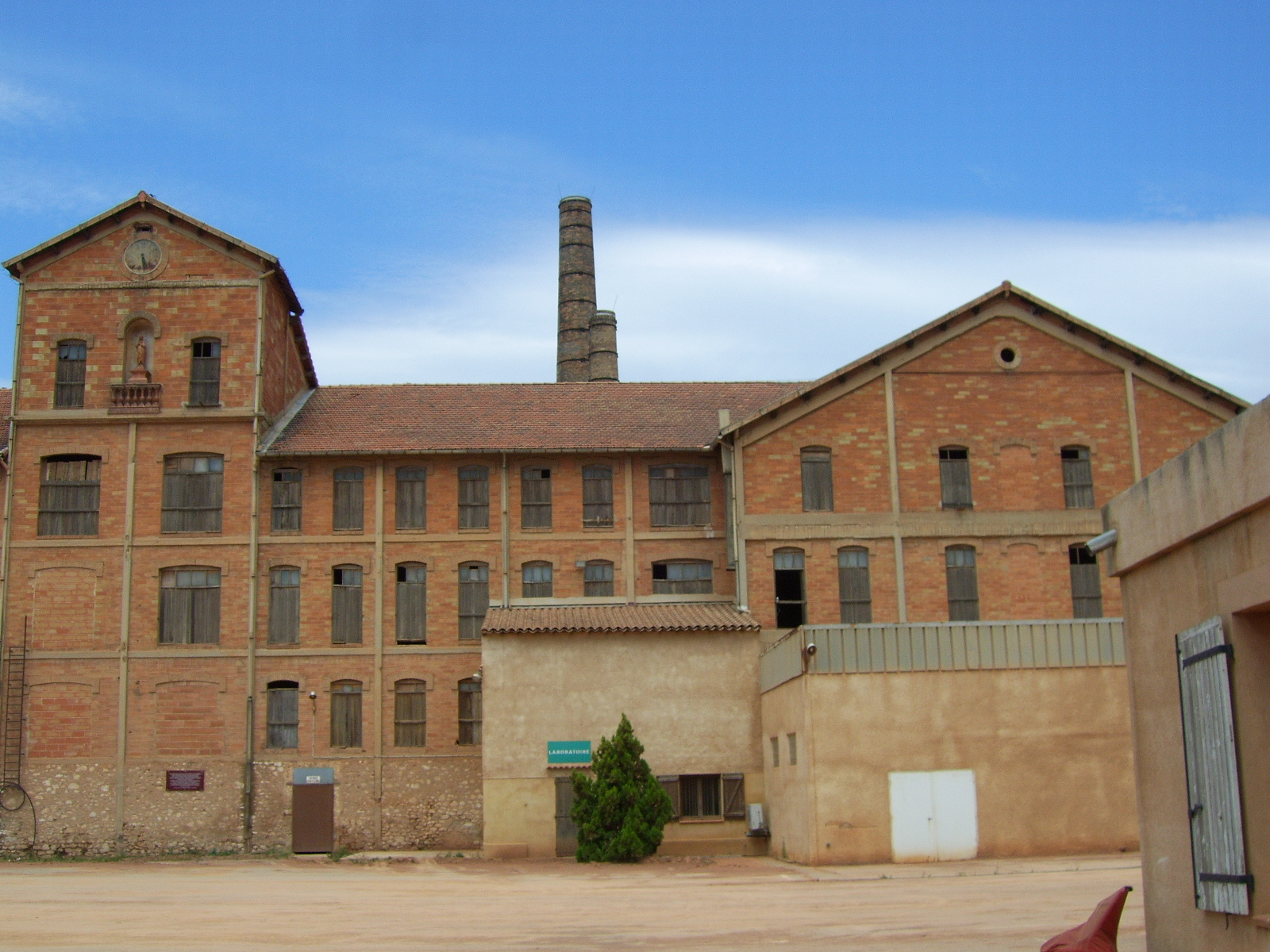
- Building which served as a concentration camp at Camp des Milles

- Location within France
- Coordinates: 43°30′12″N 5°23′08″E
- Location: Near Les Milles, Provence, France
- Built by: French Third Republic
- Operated by: French Third Republic, Vichy France
- Original use: tile factory, then internment of Germans and Austrians living in France
- Inmates: French Jews and Jewish refugees from Central Europe (mostly male)
- Number of inmates: thousands, of whom 2,000 Jews deported via Drancy, mostly to Auschwitz

The Camp des Milles [kɑ̃ de mil] was a French internment camp, opened in September 1939, in a former tile factory near the village of Les Milles, part of the commune of Aix-en-Provence (Bouches-du-Rhône). In October 2015, the site was chosen by UNESCO as the headquarters for its new Chair of Education for Citizenship, Human Sciences and Shared Memories.

== Overview ==
=== History ===
The camp was first used to intern Germans and ex-Austrians living in the Marseille area, and by June 1940, some 3,500 artists and intellectuals were detained there. Inmates included men of letters such as Fritz Brugel, Lion Feuchtwanger, William Herzog, Alfred Kantorowicz, Golo Mann, Walter Hasenclever, scientists such as Nobel Prize laureate Otto Fritz Meyerhof, as well as musicians and painters such as Erich Itor Kahn, Hans Bellmer, Max Ernst, Hermann Henry Gowa, Gustave Herlich, Max Lingner, Ferdinand Springer, Franz Meyer, Jan Meyerowitz, Peter Lipman-Wulf, François Willi Wendt and Robert Liebknecht.

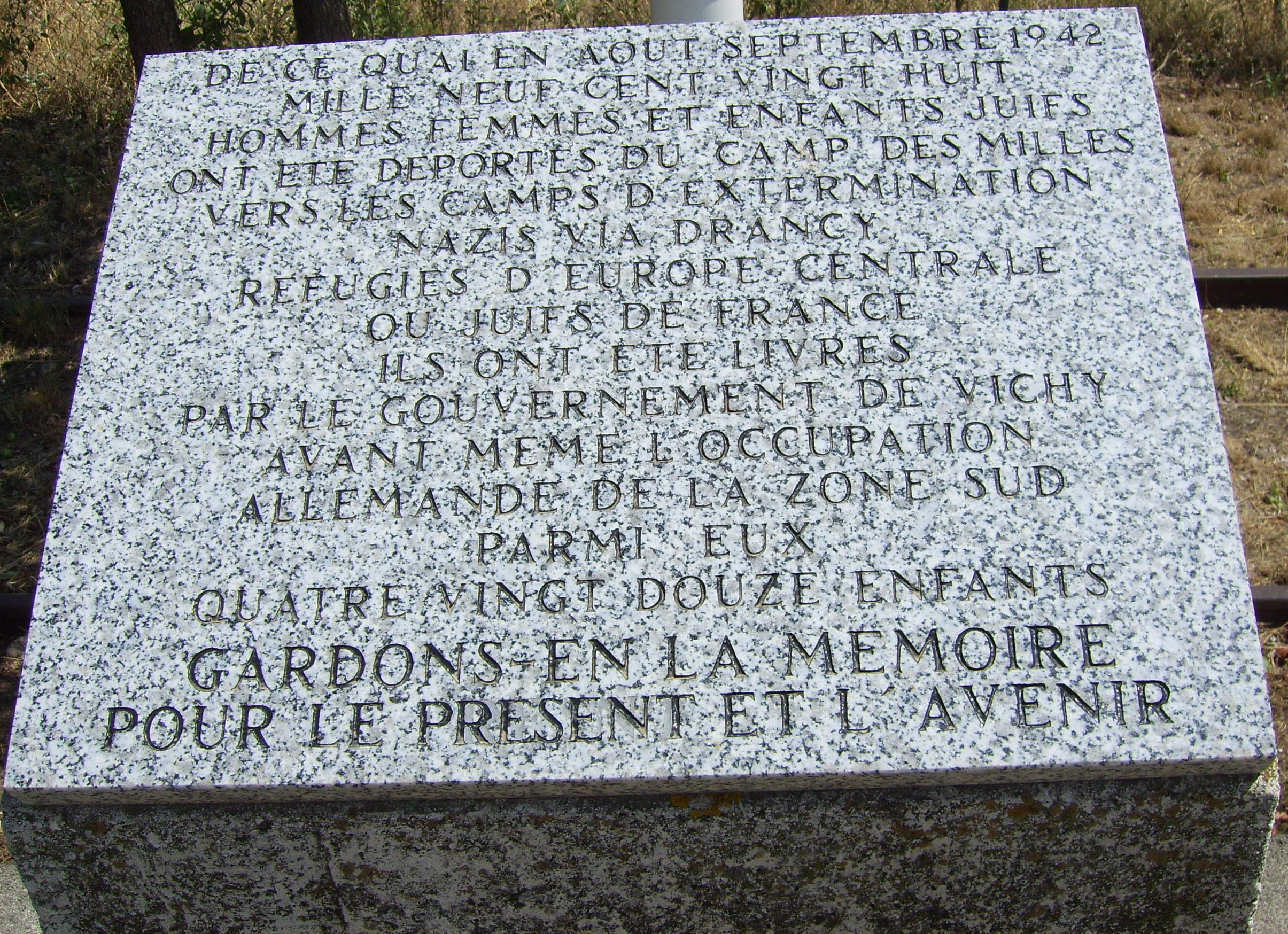
Memorial stone marking the 1,928 Jews deported in August–September 1942

Between 1941 and 1942 Le Camp des Milles was used as a transit camp for Jews, mainly men. Women were held at the Centre Bompard in Marseille, while they waited for their visas and authorisations to emigrate. As emigration became impossible, Les Milles became one of the centres de rassemblement before deportation. About 2,000 of the inmates were shipped off to the Drancy internment camp on the way to Auschwitz. After the war, the site was briefly re-opened in 1946 as a factory.

=== Memorial ===
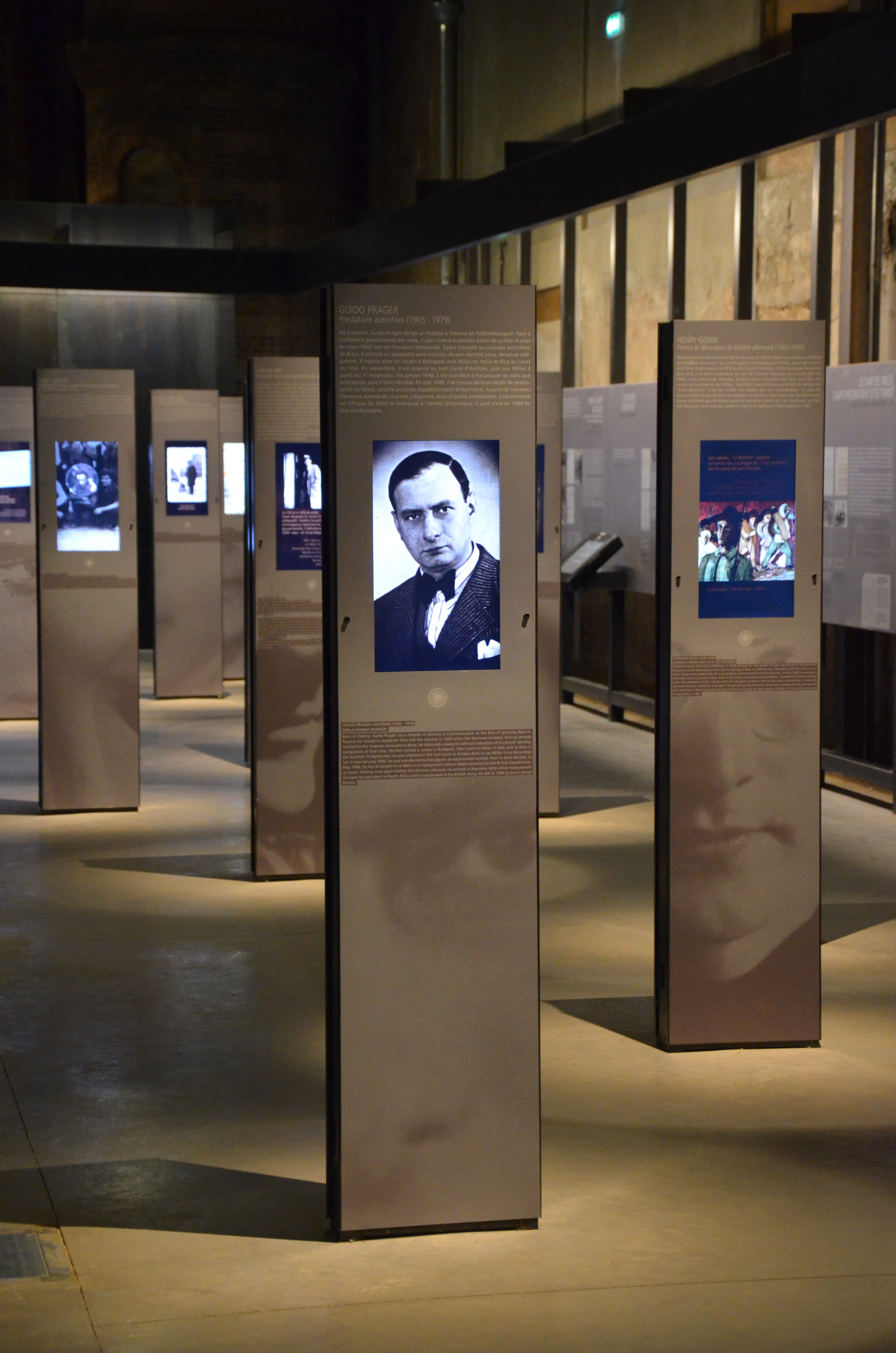
In memoriam in Camp des Milles

Since 1993, the site has served as a World War II memorial. The "Fondation du camp des Milles: mémoire et éducation" (Foundation of the Camp des Milles: Memory and Education) is directed by Alain Chouraqui, a researcher at the French National Centre for Scientific Research.

On September 10, 2012, seventy years after the last train left from Les Milles to the Auschwitz concentration camp, the memorial was inaugurated by French Prime Minister Jean-Marc Ayrault. Elie Wiesel, Simone Veil and Serge Klarsfeld visited and praised the memorial.

The Memorial also includes the sculpture, "They will never be forgotten: Serge and Beate Klarsfeld, and Marceline Kogan" by Hal Goldberg.

=== Film ===
In 1995, a movie entitled Les Milles commemorating this camp and the events that took place in this camp at the time of the Armistice in June 1940 was made.

== UNESCO Chair ==
On 8 October 2015, UNESCO launched its new Chair for Education for Citizenship, Human Sciences and Shared Memories at the Camp des Milles in the presence of French President François Hollande. The Chair will focus on research and activism centered on the history of the Holocaust, citizenship and the prevention of genocide. According to Hollande, the Chair will serve as "a national site for training and citizenship through memory."

== See also ==
- Sidney Chouraqui
- Union générale des israélites de France
