= The Wild Rose (1926 musical) =

The Wild Rose is a musical in two acts with both book and lyrics co-authored by Otto Harbach and Oscar Hammerstein II, and music by Rudolf Friml. It should not be confused with the earlier 1902 musical, The Wild Rose, by Ludwig Engländer, Harry B. Smith and George V. Hobart.

== History ==
The Wild Rose was originally written as a starring vehicle for Lew Fields in the part of the gambler Gideon Holtz. Fields played the role in tryout performances prior to the original production's Broadway run, but was forced to leave the show 24 hours prior to the work's Broadway opening when he needed an emergency appendectomy. Actor William Collier Sr. learned the part in less than a day, and performed the part for its Broadway premiere at the Martin Beck Theatre on October 20, 1926. Others in the original cast included Desiree Ellinger as Princess Elise, Joseph Santley as Monty Travers, Joseph Macaulay as Baron Frederick, Wright Kramer as King Augustus III, Len Mence as General Hodenberg, Inez Courtney as Luella Holtz, Nana Bryant as Countess Nita, Gus Shy as "Buddy" Haines, Jerome Daley as Carl, Dink Trout as Zeppo, and Neil Stone as Peter.

The Wild Rose ran for a total of 61 performances at the Martin Beck Theatre. It closed on December 11, 1926.
