= The Lottery Bride =

1930 film by Paul L. Stein

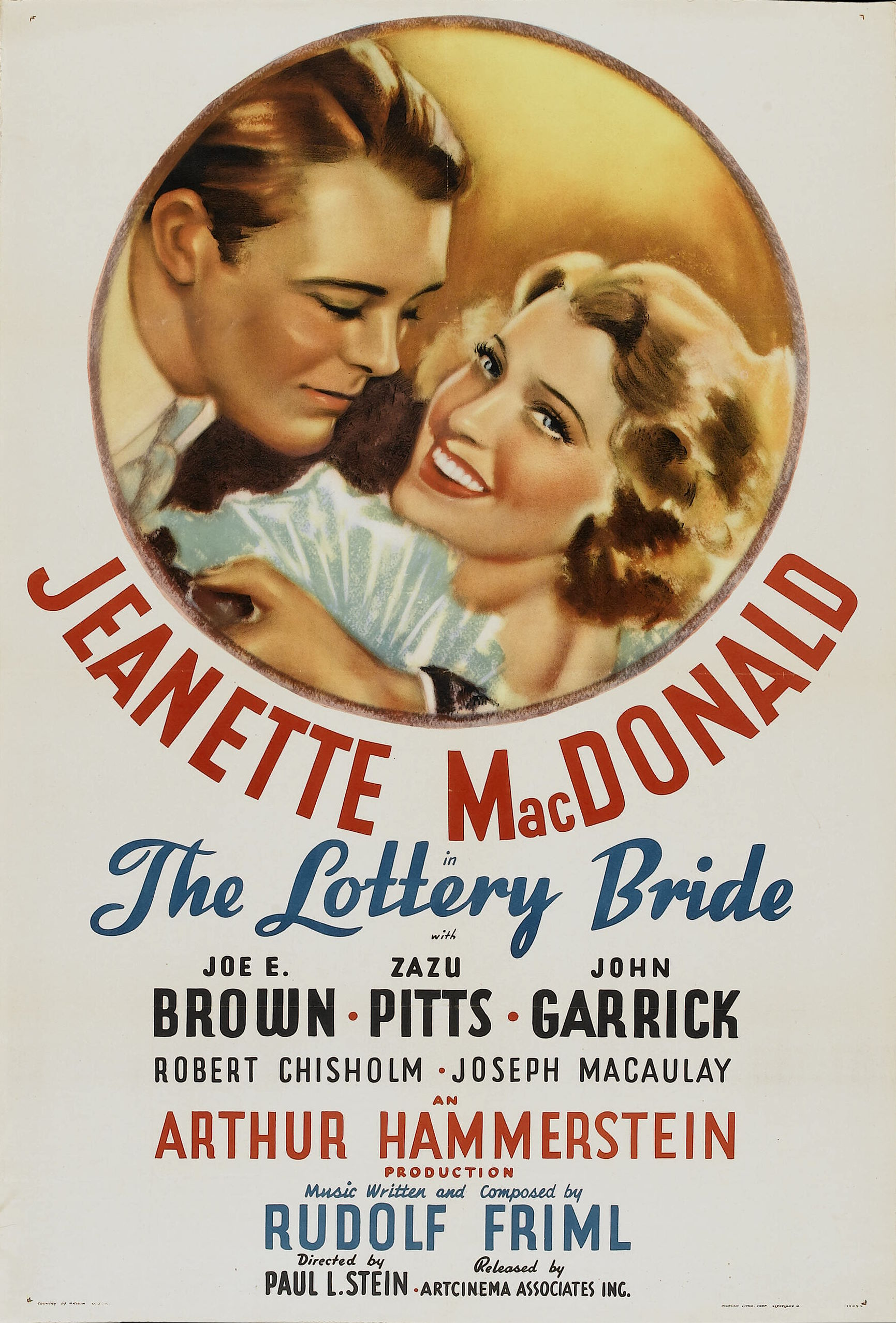
- Theatrical 1937 re-release poster
- Directed by: Paul L. Stein
- Written by: Howard Emmett Rogers; Horace Jackson; Herbert Stothart (story)
- Produced by: Joseph M. Schenck; Arthur Hammerstein
- Starring: Jeanette MacDonald; John Garrick; ZaSu Pitts; Joe E. Brown
- Edited by: Ray June; Karl Freund (uncredited)
- Music by: Rudolf Friml; Hugo Riesenfeld
- Production companies: Joseph M. Schenck Productions; Art Cinema Corporation
- Distributed by: United Artists
- Release date: November 28, 1930
- Running time: 80 minutes (1930 release); 67 minutes (1937 release)
- Country: United States
- Language: English

The Lottery Bride is a 1930 American Pre-Code musical film directed by Paul L. Stein and starring Jeanette MacDonald, John Garrick, ZaSu Pitts, and Joe E. Brown. The film was produced by Joseph M. Schenck and Arthur Hammerstein, based on the musical by Rudolf Friml, and released by United Artists. William Cameron Menzies is credited with the production design and special effects.

The film's final reel was in Technicolor in the original 80-minute release in 1930. However, most existing prints are black-and-white prints of the shorter (67-minute) 1937 re-release.

== Cast ==
- Jeanette MacDonald as Jenny
- John Garrick as Chris
- Joe E. Brown as Hoke
- Zasu Pitts as Hilda
- Robert Chisholm as Olaf
- Joseph Macauley as Alberto
- Harry Gribbon as Boris
- Carroll Nye as Nels

== Preservation status ==
On December 14, 2011, Turner Classic Movies presented a print of this film from George Eastman House, which restored the tinted sequences and the final reel in Technicolor.

== See also ==
- List of early color feature films
