= Henry Gowa =

German painter

Henry Gowa (25 May 1902 – 23 May 1990) was a German painter and stage designer.

== Life and career ==
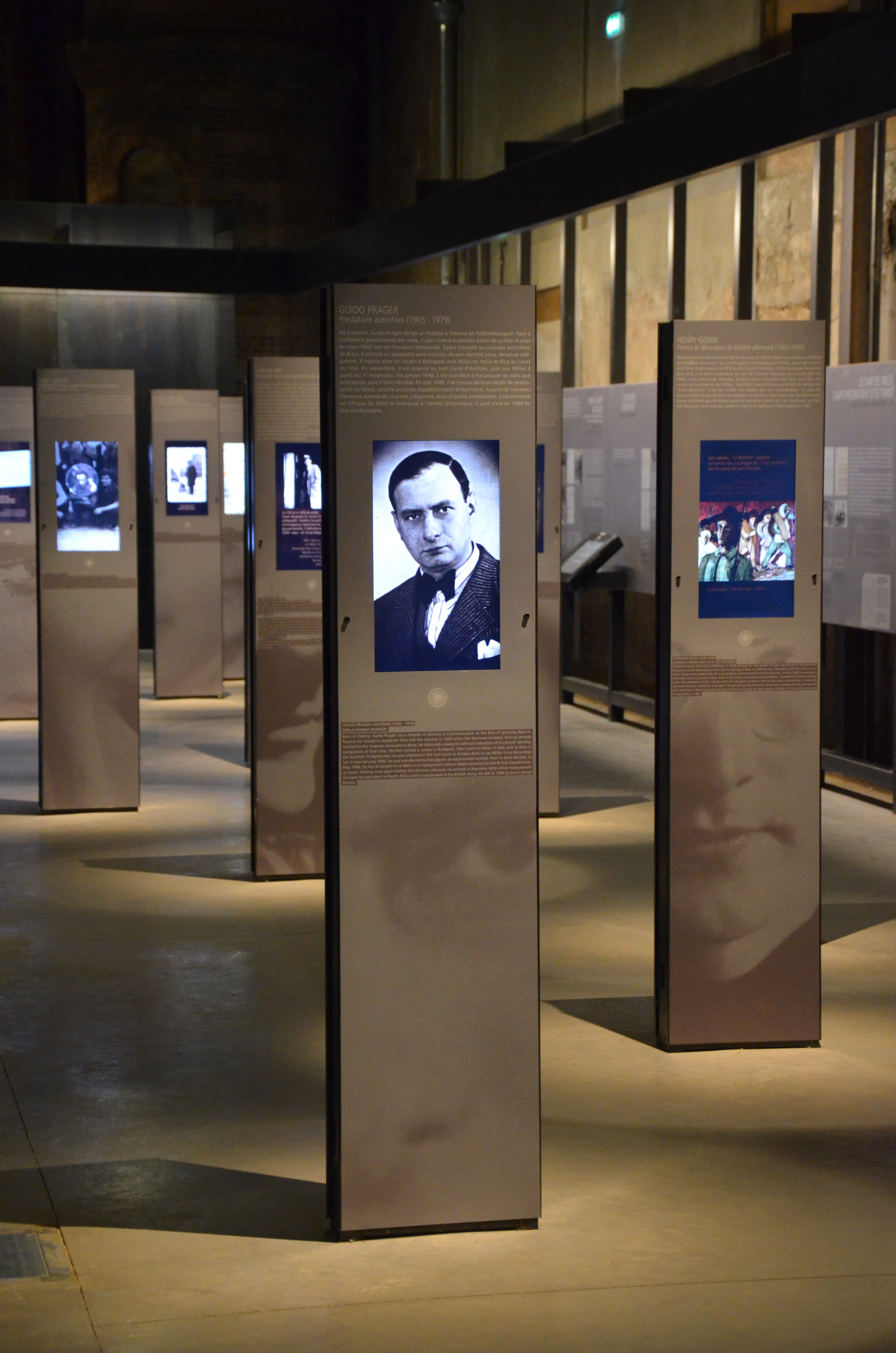
Henry Gowa in memoriam at Camp des Milles

Gowa was born Hermann Gowa in Hamburg. After studying in Munich he established himself as a stage designer, and was active in Munich, Leipzig and Frankfurt. In 1931 the progressive gallery owner Ludwig Schames organised the first exclusive exhibition of Gowa, displaying his paintings as well as stage designs.

With the rise to power of the Nazis, Gowa emigrated to Paris, and was interned several times during the Second World War. He changed his name to Henry to distance himself from his namesake Hermann Göring. Through his contacts in the French Resistance, Gowa found refuge in a village in the mountains of Southern France, and escaped The Holocaust.

After 1945 he returned to Germany and became the director of the Schule für Kunst und Handwerk in Saarbrücken, where he established a connection with Frans Masereel. Later he became director of the Werkkunstschule in Offenbach am Main (today the Hochschule für Gestaltung Offenbach), and played a key role in its internationalisation, through exhibitions such as Young French Painting (Offenbach, 1955) and Young German Painting (Paris, 1955). In 1957 he became the chief commissioner of the German section of the Paris Biennale. He later received the Federal Cross of Merit.

He died in Munich, having spent his final years in Oberschleißheim, where his estate of 1,200 works was stored. This estate is now on permanent loan at the Ludwig Meidner Archive of the Jewish Museum Frankfurt.

== Work ==
Initially a devotee of Cézanne, while in exile Gowa was influenced by the protagonists of the French avant-garde, whom he came to know personally, including Bonnard, Chagall, Matisse and Picasso. After the war he increasingly sought more universal modes of expression, creating abstract compositions poised between explosive dynamics and balanced harmony.

== See also ==
- List of German painters
