= Exiles (play) =

Irish play

- First edition of Exiles, 1918.
- Author: James Joyce
- Language: English
- Subject: Famous writer returns to Dublin after nine years of exile
- Publisher: Grant Richards
- Publication date: 25 May 1918
- Publication place: Ireland
- Media type: Print (hardback & paperback)
- Pages: 96–159, depending on edition
- ISBN: 978-1-85459-952-0
- OCLC: 74217902

Exiles is James Joyce's only extant play and draws on the story of "The Dead", the final short story in Joyce's story collection Dubliners. The play was rejected by W. B. Yeats for production by the Abbey Theatre. Its first major London performance was in 1970, when Harold Pinter directed it at the Mermaid Theatre.

In terms of both its critical and popular reception, Exiles has proven the least successful of all of Joyce's published works. In making his case for the defence of the play, Padraic Colum conceded: "...critics have recorded their feeling that [Exiles] has not the enchantment of Portrait of the Artist nor the richness of [Ulysses]... They have noted that Exiles has the shape of an Ibsen play and have discounted it as being the derivative work of a young admirer of the great Scandinavian dramatist."

== Summary ==
Joyce himself described the structure of the play as "three cat and mouse acts".

The play follows four players and two couples, Richard Rowan, a writer and his "common-law wife" Bertha, and Robert Hand with his cousin and previous lover Beatrice, both old friends of the previous couple.

"The plot is deceptively simple: Richard, a writer, returns to Ireland from Rome with Bertha, the mother of his illegitimate son, Archie. While there, he meets his former lover and correspondent Beatrice Justice and former drinking partner and now successful journalist Robert Hand. Robert was also Beatrice’s lover, and here the complications begin."

As jealousy develops throughout the relationships the action meditates mostly in a budding relationship between Hand and Bertha and thus in Hand's attempts at seduction with the lover of his friend.

The first act takes place at Rowan's house where Hand makes his first advance at Bertha. After kissing her "with passion" several times Hand requests she join him in his home for a second meeting later that evening. Bertha in turn confides in Rowan and questions whether or not to accept his invitation. To this, Rowan retorts she must do whatever she pleases.

In the second act, Hand waits, expecting Bertha at the appointed hour but instead is surprised when Rowan appears. Calmly, Rowan explains his knowledge of Hand's attempts at wooing Bertha but is interrupted when Bertha herself knocks at the door. Rowan returns home, leaving his wife alone with Hand who continues his advances toward Bertha. The act ends inconclusively, with Hand asking if Bertha loves him, and Bertha explaining: "I like you, Robert. I think you are good... Are you satisfied?"

The third act returns to Rowan's home at seven o'clock the following morning. Bertha's maid informs her of Rowan's departure from the home an hour earlier, as he left for a walk on the strand. Printed in the morning newspapers is a favourable article written about Rowan, written the previous evening by Hand himself.

The events of the previous night between Bertha and Hand are unclear, as both parties agree it was a "dream." But appearances demonstrate Hand and Bertha shared "a sacred night of love."

Hand reports to Rowan, assuring him Bertha in fact did not stay the night but instead Hand spent the night alone. Claiming to have visited the Vice-Chancellor's lodge, returned home to write the newspaper article, then gone to a nightclub where he picked up a divorcée and had sex with her ("what the subtle Duns Scotus calls a death of the spirit took place") in the cab on the way home. Following this conversation, Hand leaves for his cousin's house in Surrey while Rowan and Bertha are reconciled. Bertha admits that she longs to meet her lover, but asserts that the lover is Rowan himself.

The resolution of the play lies precisely in the sense of doubt about what occurred between Hand and Bertha between Acts Two and Three. Rowan is wounded by the sense of doubt that he admits he longed for. Indeed, he sees this sense of doubt as what enables him "to be united with [Bertha] in body and soul in utter nakedness".

== Inspiration ==
There are obvious parallels to be drawn with Joyce's own life – Joyce and Nora Barnacle lived, unmarried, in Trieste, during the years the fictional Rowans were living in Rome. During this time, Joyce and his lover considered themselves to be living in Exile, directly mirroring the setting of Exiles. Robert Hand too, draws a connection to Joyce's personal life as he resembles two friends of Joyce's, Oliver St. John Gogarty and Vincent Cosgrave, and even shares a few defining characteristics with them both. Another source of inspiration used by the author to model the character of Robert Hand was the Italian journalist Roberto Prezioso, which he met during his time in Trieste. Similarly, the character of Beatrice Justice has been said to reflect a cousin of Joyce's, Elizabeth Justice, who died in 1912. However, Exiles is by no means straightforwardly autobiographical.

"The great question which Joyce sought to use as the basis for a drama was that of human freedom and human dignity. It is exposed and focused in terms of love and sexual relationships."

== Performances ==
Exiles was forced into publication before production, despite the best efforts of both Joyce and Ezra Pound, to whom Joyce had shown the transcript in the fall of 1915. When Joyce was unable to find a theater in the UK or US to stage it, the play had its world premiere at the Munich Kammerspiele in Munich. It was directed by Erwin von Busse and received largely unfavorable reviews.

Harold Pinter's staging of Exiles in 1970 received greater praise, with many critics claiming that the play had been "revived". A 2006 production directed by James Macdonald at the National Theatre also enjoyed a positive reception. Some critics have claimed that Exiles may have been reviewed poorly in its time due to Joyce's progressive ideas about love and relationships.
