= List of international professional associations =

This is a list of notable professional associations which are international organizations. These organizations are either chartered by international bodies or by relevant national professional associations from multiple countries.

- Commission on Isotopic Abundances and Atomic Weights
- Global Facility Management Association
- International Council of Nurses
- International Association for Plant Taxonomy
- International Association of Hydrogeologists
- International Astronomical Union
- International Council on Systems Engineering
- International Federation of Inventors' Associations
- International Federation for Information Processing
- International Federation of Robotics
- International Federation of Shipmasters' Associations
- International Federation of Translators
- International Planetarium Society
- International Union of Pure and Applied Chemistry
- ISACA
- PEN International
- Water Environment Federation
- World Association of Chefs Societies
- World Federation of Engineering Organizations
- World Federation of Neurosurgical Societies

== See also ==
- List of learned societies
