= Franz Meyer =

German engineer (1868–1933)

Franz A. Meyer (6 June 1868 in Hamburg – 29 May 1933 in Jena) was an engineer and designer of optical instruments. His father Claus August Meyer (born 1831) was a painter in Hamburg. His mother was Anne Sophia Elisabeth Sievers (born 1832).

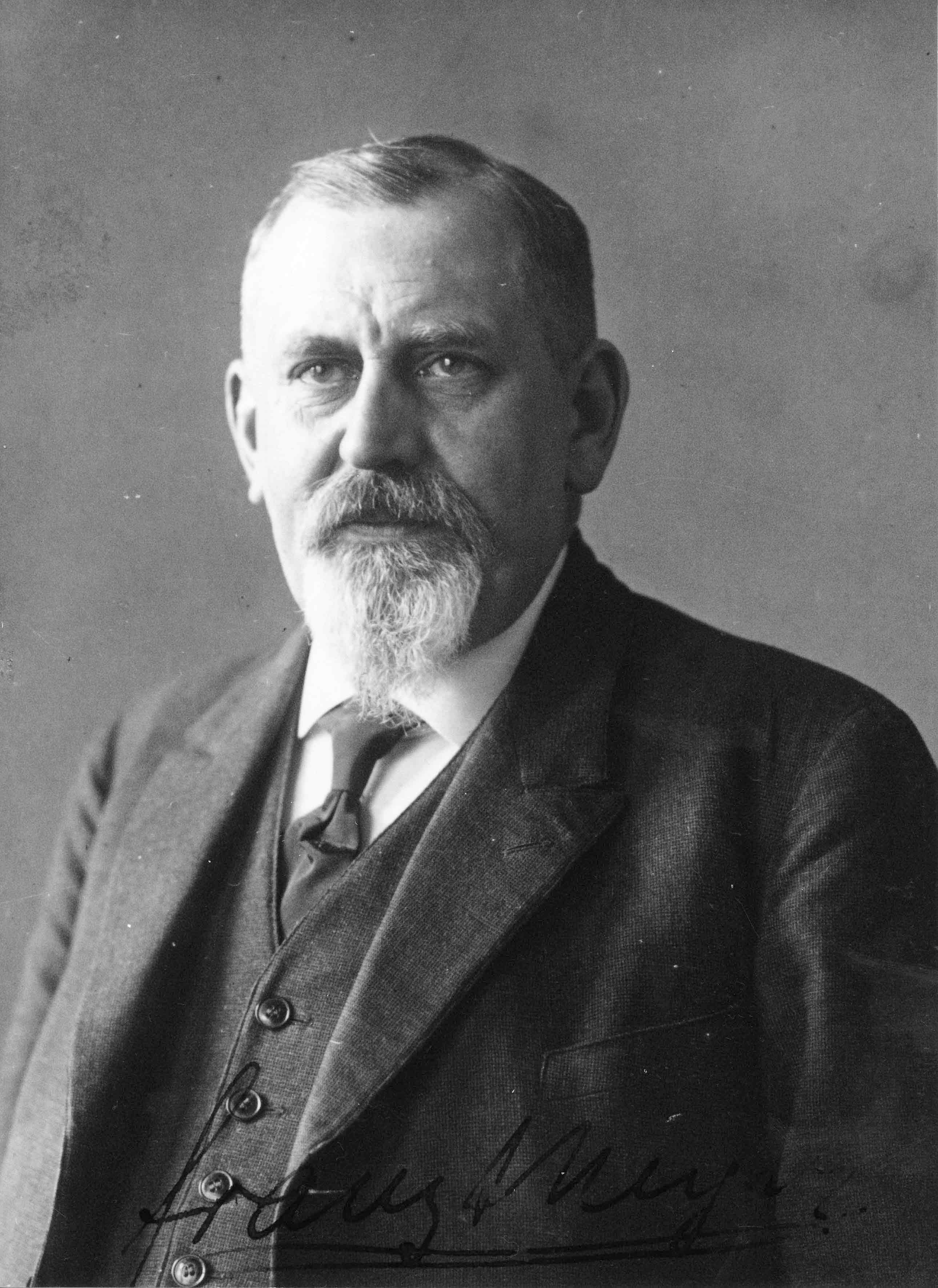
Franz A. Meyer (1924), Foto Zeiss Archiv Jena

== Education ==
Franz Meyer studied at the Hamburg State Trade School and then worked for more than ten years in industry and as a freelance engineer.

== First activities ==
His work at the Berlin mechanical engineering company Paul Hoppe was important for his further development: he played a key role in the design and construction of the large Treptow telescope. This Large Refractor, also known as the sky cannon, is the longest movable telescope in the world. To this day, it is the main attraction of the Archenhold Observatory in Berlin's Treptower Park. This public observatory was built for the Berlin Trade Fair in 1896 to mark the 25th anniversary of Berlin's elevation to the status of capital of the Reich.

== First engineer with a university education at Carl Zeiss Jena (1902) ==
After leaving the Hoppe company, Franz Meyer spent several years working in general mechanical engineering, especially on hydraulics, until Ernst Abbe was able to recruit him for the Jena Zeiss factory in 1902. Meyer's special feeling for the dimensions and performance limits of the designs led to the famous remark among his employees:

Wenn man eine MEYERsche Konstruktion in irgendeine Richtung – sei es nach Größe, Fehlereinflüssen und Toleranzen – nachrechnet und die Rechnung ergibt Widersprüche mit der Konstruktion, so kann man sicher sein, daß man sich verrechnet hat.

Translation:

If you recalculate a MEYER design in any direction – be it in terms of size, error influences and tolerances – and the calculation shows contradictions with the construction, you can be sure that you have miscalculated

This is also why he received all sorts of nicknames such as "Kugelmeyer" or "Kettenmeyer" (translated: "ball Meyer" or "chain Meyer").

== Astro department ==
In 1896, Abbe announced that "before the next year is over, our workshop will be involved in the construction of astronomical telescopes." In August 1897, the astro department was founded at Zeiss. On the one hand, new methods were needed for the production and alignment of optical devices, but on the other hand, drives were needed for the alignment of these optics and for tracking when observing the stars. As a result, the drawing offices were replaced by large design rooms - the "unnoticed optical workshop" was also linguistically replaced by the name "The Zeiss factory."

== Examples of significant innovations and contributions ==
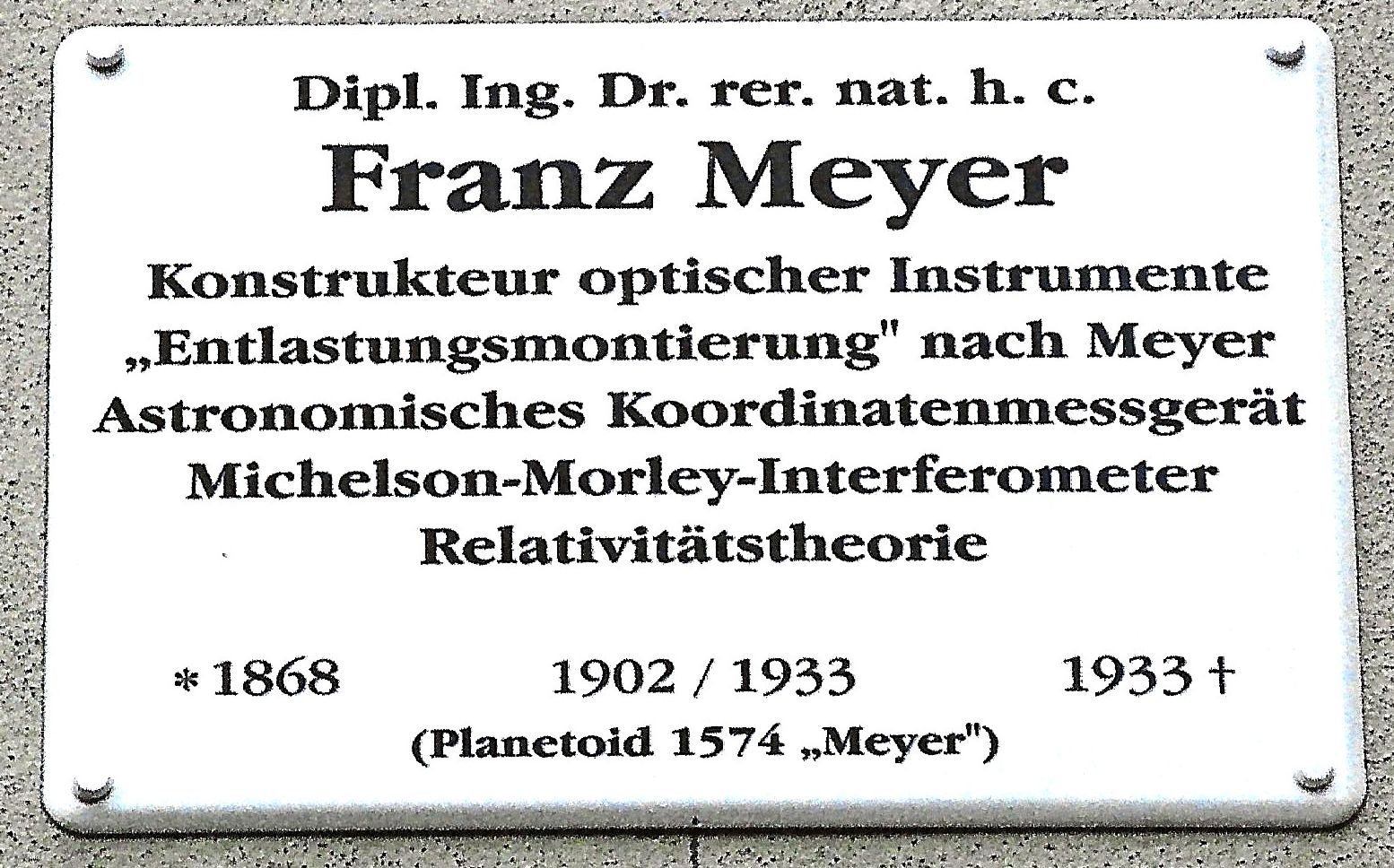
metal sign on Bau 15, Ernst-Abbe-Platz 5, Jena, Foto: G. Herzog (2020)

1. Telescope improvements (especially for large astronomical devices)
2. Clockwork drive (regulator)
3. Coordinate measuring machine
4. Interference length dividing machine
5. Parabolic mirror
6. Main designer of the planetarium developed and produced at Carl Zeiss Jena for "Deutsches Museum München". ( opened 1925)

== Relief mount ==
Franz Meyer improved the astronomical telescopes through many important innovations. Carl Büchele, his successor from 1933 to 1945, writes:

Der Grundgedanke seiner genialen Entlastungsmontierung - in der Fachwelt heute meist kurz Meyersche Montierung genannt – ist heute wohl Gemeingut aller Astronomen geworden.

== Joos experiment 1930 ==
By producing high-resolution diffraction gratings in a basement room at Zeiss, Franz Meyer came into contact with Georg Joos, who had been a professor of theoretical physics at the University of Jena since 1924. Joos wanted to experimentally prove that Einstein's theory of relativity was exactly valid despite apparently contradictory results. At the same time, the ether hypothesis was also at stake. Promoted by the scientific director of Zeiss, Rudolf Straubel, under the direction of Franz Meyer and with the support of C. Büchele and Ing. Köppen, a construction was developed that pushed the boundaries of what was possible at the time. The device was built in the astronomy workshop. The experiment, with a much higher level of accuracy than the previous results of the Michelson-Morley experiment, is today considered an experimentum crucis (crucial experiment) for modern physics.

== Rewards ==
The Friedrich Schiller University of Jena awarded him the title of Dr. h.c. in 1930 for his services to scientific instrument construction – a very rare award for a practicing engineer.
