= Walter Hasenclever =

German poet and playwright (1890–1940)

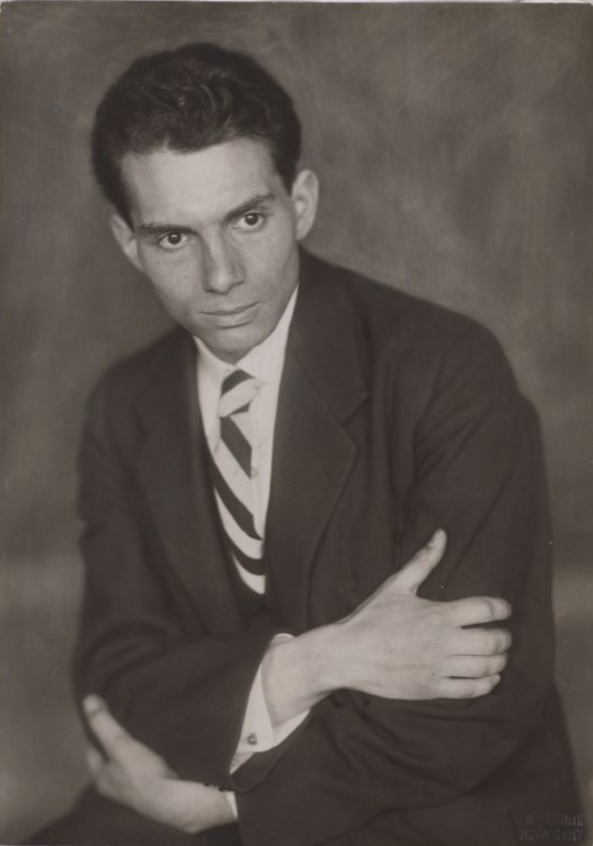
- Hasenclever c. 1917
- Born: Walter Georg Alfred Hasenclever; 8 July 1890; Aachen, Germany
- Died: 22 June 1940 (aged 49); Les Milles, France
- Occupations: Poet, Playwright
- Writing career
- Notable work: The Son (1914)
- Literary movement: Expressionism

Walter Georg Alfred Hasenclever (8 July 1890 – 22 June 1940) was a German Jewish Expressionist poet and playwright. His works were banned when the Nazis came to power and he went into exile in France. There he was imprisoned as a "foreign enemy". He died in Les Milles (Camp des Milles) near Aix-en-Provence.

== Early life ==
Born in Aachen, Germany, the son of the doctor Carl Georg Hasenclever (1855–1934) and his wife Mathilde Anna (née Reiss; 1869–1953), Walter Hasenclever began studying law at Oxford University in 1908 before changing to the University of Lausanne. From 1909 to 1914 he studied in Leipzig, where he became interested in literature and philosophy.

== Career ==
In 1910 he published his first volume of poems, Towns, nights and people (Städte, Nächte und Menschen). In 1914 his play The Son (Der Sohn) was his first successful Expressionist drama.

At first, Hasenclever was pro-war and volunteered for military service. Soon he came to reject the war, simulated mental illness, and was released from duty in 1917. That same year he was presented with the Kleist Prize for his passionate adaptation of Sophocles' Antigone. He was a good friend of the artist Oskar Kokoschka who depicted him in his 1918 work "The Friends" with Käthe Richter in Dresden, where Hasenclever was recuperating from his supposed illness in a sanatorium.

In 1924, Hasenclever met Kurt Tucholsky; at this time he worked as a French correspondent for the magazine 8-Uhr-Abendblatt, spending a lot of time in Paris, where he also befriended the dramatist Jean Giraudoux. In 1926 he produced the successful comedy A Better Gentleman (Ein besserer Herr) and in 1928 the comedy Marriages are Made in Heaven (Ehen werden im Himmel geschlossen). In 1930, he wrote scripts for Metro-Goldwyn-Mayer for Greta Garbo; at this time he lived in Berlin in an "artists' colony".

== Exile, capture and death ==
When the National Socialists took power in 1933, his works were banned, burned during the book burning, then removed from libraries. Hasenclever went into exile in Nice. In 1934, he married Edith Schläfer there.

During the Second World War Hasenclever was imprisoned twice as a "foreign enemy" in France. When France fell to Germany, he was in the prison camp of Camp des Milles in the south-east of France. In the early hours of 22 June 1940 he killed himself with an overdose of the barbiturate Veronal, so as not to fall into the hands of the Nazis.

== Legacy ==
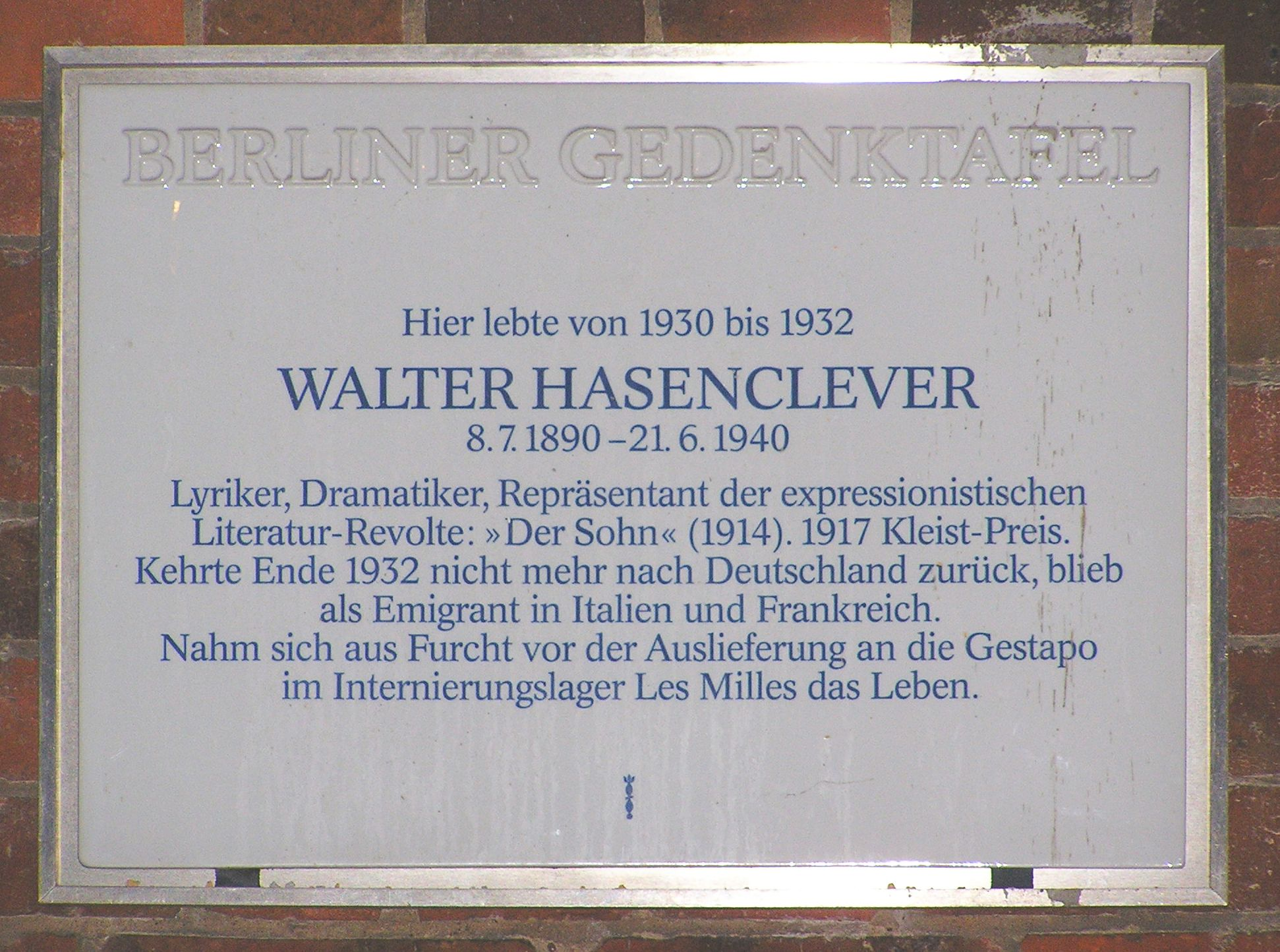
Memorial plaque for Hasenclever at Ludwig-Barnay-Platz 3, Berlin-Wilmersdorf

Since 1996 the Walter Hasenclever Prize has been awarded to a German-language writer every two years. Winners have included Peter Rühmkorf (1996), George Tabori (1998), Oskar Pastior (2000), Marlene Steerewitz (2002) and Friedrich Christian Delius (2004). The funds come from the Walter Hasenclever Society (Walter-Hasenclever-Gesellschaft) as well as the town of Aachen, the Schiller Society, and Hasenclever's old school, the Einhard Gymnasium.

== Selected filmography ==
- Ein besserer Herr (1928)
- Diary of a Coquette (1929)
- Love Songs (1930)
- Rendezvous (1930)
- Men Behind Bars (1931)
