= Rapid Transit (play) =

- Written by: Lajos Egri
- Characters: Imre Szabo; Velver; Otto; Sandor et al
- Original language: Hungarian
- Subject: furious pace of our machine age
- Genre: Drama-satire
- Setting: Hakuba-Hekuba Land

Premiere
- Date premiered: April 7, 1927
- Place premiered: Provincetown Playhouse; New York City

Rapid Transit was a play by Lajos Egri that premiered at the Provincetown Playhouse, New York, in April 1927 and closed before the end of the month after 20 performances. Horace Liveright had bought and produced this work. Egri's expressionist play was translated from his original Hungarian by Gustav Davidson and Francis Edwards Faragoh, and adapted by Charles Recht.

Egri pictured a world in which all of life is compressed into twenty-four hours. Through the play, Egri wanted to convey a sense of the hectic pace of the machine age of his times. Children grow to maturity in a few minutes; meals are eaten in split seconds; tabloid newspapers are issued at intervals of a second or two, and the loss of half a minute is a serious matter.

Realizing that this notion alone was not quite sufficient to carry a play, Egri broadened his vision to afford a comprehensive view of the world's front page. Wars and justice, taxes and public opinion: all of these Egri incorporated in a manner that was a hallmark of expressionistic drama. Rapid Transit had a prologue and six scenes. There were almost seventy cast members. The sets conveyed an impression of cogwheels, greasy steel pistons, chains, derricks, clanking, rumbling, thumping. The tempo was blinding.

The New York Times described the play as "chaotic at times, but sporadically interesting".
