= Les Milles =

Coordinates: 43°30′N 5°23′E

Coat of arms of Les Milles village

Les Milles is a village, part of the commune of Aix-en-Provence, in southern France.

Camp des Milles was opened in September 1939 at a former tile factory in the village. Originally a French internment camp to detain undesirable aliens, it was later used as a transit camp for Jews to be deported to extermination camps, mainly Auschwitz.

== See also ==
- Camp des Milles
