= The Son (Hasenclever play) =

1914 German play by Walter Hasenclever

- Original language: German
- Written by: Walter Hasenclever
- Characters: The Son; The Tutor; The Friend; The Fräulein; The Father; Cherubim; Von Tuchmeyer; Prince Scheitel; Adrienne; Police Inspector
- Subject: Intergenerational conflict
- Genre: Expressionism
- Setting: The present (1914), over 3 days

Premiere
- Date: 1916
- Place: Dresden

The Son (German: Der Sohn) is a five-act Expressionist play by the German playwright Walter Hasenclever. It was the first self-proclaimed, full-length Expressionist play to be produced, though its dramatic structure is more or less realistic. It takes as its subject the conflict between the generations and a rejection of the world in general by the young. It is a semi-autobiographical work.

It was written in 1912, first published in 1914, and first performed in 1916 at the Albert-Theater in Dresden, although Hasenclever had read the play at the literary cabaret Das Gnu in early 1914. Ernst Deutsch played the Son to great acclaim.

The play ends with the Son killing his father. He then "strides triumphantly over his father's corpse into a future full of glorious potential".
