= Lajos Egri =

American dramatist

- Egri circa 1945
- Born: June 4, 1888; Eger, Austria-Hungary
- Died: February 7, 1967 (age 78); Los Angeles, California, US
- Occupation: teacher of creative writing
- Known for: treatise on playwriting
- Spouse: Ilona Egri (April 18, 1907 - 1967, his death)

Lajos N. Egri (June 4, 1888 – February 7, 1967) was a Hungarian-American playwright and teacher of creative writing. He is the author of The Art of Dramatic Writing, which is widely regarded as one of the best works on the subject of playwriting, as well as its companion textbook, The Art of Creative Writing. Beyond the theater, his methods have also been used to write short stories, novels, and screenplays.

== Early years ==
Born into a Jewish family in Eger, Austria-Hungary, Egri came to the US in 1906 and worked in a New York garment factory as a tailor and presser. He was an active member of the International Ladies' Garment Workers Union.

== Playwright ==
Egri wrote his first three-act play at the age of ten, according to his biographical sketch in The Art of Dramatic Writing. In 1927, Rapid Transit, Egri's expressionist play, was translated from Hungarian and produced at the Provincetown Playhouse in New York. Casting about for some adequate means of conveying a sense of the furious pace of this machine age, Egri pictured a world in which all of life is compressed into twenty-four hours. Children grow to maturity in a few minutes; meals are eaten in split seconds; tabloid newspapers are issued at intervals of a second or two, and the loss of half a minute is a serious matter. The New York Times described the play as "chaotic at times, but sporadically interesting." Egri's other plays include the satirical comedy Believe Me or Not (1933), Tornado (1938), This is Love (1945 with Arden Young) and The Cactus Club (1957). His one-act Hungarian plays include Satan is Dead, Spiders, Between Two Gods, There Will be No Performance, and Devils.

== Teacher of playwriting ==
Egri taught courses in playwriting, first in New York (1860 Broadway and 2 Columbus Circle), and then in Los Angeles. One student who garnered much attention was a 63-year-old grandmother, Esther Kaufman, who attended Egri's classes. Egri encouraged Kaufman to write a play about growing up on the Lower East Side. The result was A Worm in the Horseradish, which had its premiere at the Maidman Playhouse in New York, March 13, 1961, and closed May 28 after mixed reviews. Woody Allen was a great admirer of his books. "I still think his The Art of Dramatic Writing is the most stimulating and best book on the subject ever written, and I have them all," Allen told biographer Eric Lax. Star Trek creator Gene Roddenberry was also an admirer of Egri and kept a copy of The Art of Dramatic Writing at his office desk. He claimed that "if a writer follows its principles, he'll never go wrong!"

== The Art of Dramatic Writing ==
Originally published by Simon & Schuster in 1942 as How to Write a Play, Egri's treatise was revised and published as The Art of Dramatic Writing in 1946.

Egri argues in The Art of Dramatic Writing against Aristotle's view of character being secondary to plot (as stated in Aristotle's Poetics). According to Egri, well-defined characters will drive the plot themselves, and so the foundation of character is the essential germination of a well crafted story.

Central to Egri's argument is his claim that the best stories follow the logical method of thesis, antithesis, synthesis, or dialectic, to prove what he calls a "premise." A premise, as Egri describes it, is a thematic truth. In The Art of Dramatic Writing he offers as an example the premise that "stinginess leads to ruin." Having settled on this theme, Egri writes, the playwright can detect in the statement the suggestion of a story's beginning, middle, and end: first, the establishment of an obsessively stingy character; next, the collision of that character's stinginess with inevitable opposition, or antithesis; and finally the character's ruin. Egri also emphasizes what he sees as the ever-present role of change in all forms of life, forcing people to evolve and synthesize new philosophies in the face of one overwhelming obstacle after another.

== The Art of Creative Writing ==
In 1965, Egri expanded on his views of character development and motivation in the book, The Art of Creative Writing. His theses in this work can be summarized as follows:

1. All human beings are fundamentally selfish, their primary drive being to feel, or be perceived as, important.
2. Human character is fixed and does not change significantly over life.
3. Creative writing should start from identification of one or more main characters, rather than from actions, events, or incidents.
4. Characters should have an overriding trait (Egri's word is ‘compulsion’), typically negative, such as greed, snobbery or extravagance, coupled with the determination that that trait should prevail.
5. The author should clearly understand his characters’ motivations, if necessary by providing histories/biographies which inform the story even if they do not form part of it.
6. A satisfying structure – used in many of the book's examples – is one in which two characters with opposing flaws are inextricably bound together, leading to a crisis in which the conflict is resolved by some dramatic action.

== Later life ==
Egri taught creative writing in his West Los Angeles home (at 11635 Mayfield Avenue) until shortly before his death. He died of a heart attack at Cedars of Lebanon Hospital.
