= Expressionism (theatre) =

Theatrical genre

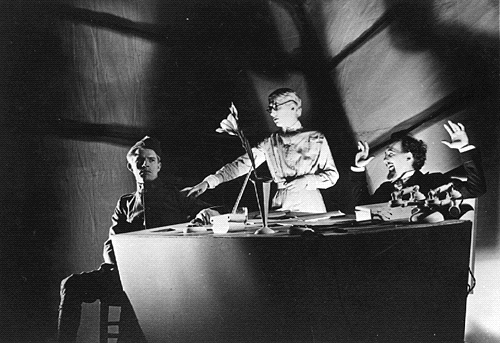
Expressionism on the American stage: Paul Green and Kurt Weill's Johnny Johnson (1936).

Expressionism was a movement in drama and theatre that principally developed in Germany in the early decades of the 20th century. It was then popularized in the United States, Spain, China, the U.K., and all around the world. Similar to the broader movement of Expressionism in the arts, Expressionist theatre utilized theatrical elements and scenery with exaggeration and distortion to deliver strong feelings and ideas to audiences.

== History ==
The early Expressionist theatrical and dramatic movement in Germany had Dionysian, Hellenistic, and Nietzsche philosophy influences. It was impacted by the likes of German poet August Stramm and Swedish playwright August Strindberg. Murderer, the Hope of Women by Oskar Kokoschka, written in 1907 and first performed in Vienna in 1909, was the first fully expressionist drama. Expressionism was then explored and evolved in Germany by a multitude of playwrights, the most famous of which being Georg Kaiser, whose first successful play, The Burghers of Calais, was written in 1913 and first performed in 1917. Another highly influential German Expressionist playwright was Ernst Toller who had his first successful play, Transformation, premier in Berlin in 1919. These German playwrights and many others explored and evolved expressionist theatre and drama until the movement faded in popularity throughout Germany by 1924. In the 1920s theatrical expressionism became very popular in the United States among audiences and artists alike. Eugene O'Neill, although widely known for his realist dramas, was the first playwright in the United States to experience success with an expressionist piece. O'Neill's The Hairy Ape was the first fully expressionist play written by an American playwright, premiering in 1922. Elmer Rice gained notoriety shortly after with the premier of his expressionist play The Adding Machine in 1923. These playwrights and many others within the United States went on to write quite successful expressionist plays including Lajos Egri's Rapid Transit (play), first premiering in 1927, and Sophie Treadwell's Machinal, first premiering in 1928. Expressionism in theatre and drama has also experienced success in China and Spain. Notably, The Wilderness (play) by Cao Yu and Yama Zhao by Hong Shen were frequently produced in the 1920s and 1930s in China. Expressionism in Chinese theatre has recently experienced a resurgence in popularity since the 1980s. In Spain Ramon Valle-lnclan's Esperpento, which was first produced in 1925, was very similar to German expressionist plays of the same decade.

== Theatrical elements ==
The most defining characteristics of Expressionism in the theatrical context were the emphasis on uncovering intense emotions and the failure of societal systems that have been overlooked. Commonly, Expressionist theatre critiqued the government, big business, the military, family structures, and sexism. Expressionism shifted emphasis from the text of pieces to the physical performance and highlighted the director's role in creating a vehicle to deliver theirs and the playwright's thoughts and feelings to audiences. This shift also reflected a greater faith in audiences' ability to receive a playwright's message on their own without complete textual guidance. In early German expressionist theatre, the protagonists often represented variations on the New Man, one who was neither too meek or too headstrong, who was intelligent, and who was unafraid to act on their morals. Structurally, Expressionism in theatre was often characterized by episodic scenes or station dramas (Stationendramen) which were modeled after the Stations of the Cross. Machinal by Sophie Treadwell utilized nine episodes to tell the story of Helen Jones instead of scenes. Expressionist theatre also commonly adopted very general or simple names for the characters in the plays, like A Man, Woman, or in The Adding Machine, "Mr. Zero"

== Design characteristics ==
Expressionist theatre had very different scenic design compared to the theatrical movements that came before it like naturalism and romanticism. Set pieces and props were typically used sparingly with much more emphasis on creating striking sound and light design. When scenery was used, it was typically very symbolic and was a purposeful exaggeration or understatement of the setting. Expressionist scenic design focus was more on aiding in the delivery of a scene's meaning versus a mere representation of setting. Emil Pirchan, Ludwig Sievert, and Ernst Stern were very influential expressionist scenic designers.

== Famous works and playwrights ==
- Georg Kaiser: The Burghers of Calais (written in 1913, first premiered in 1917), From Morn to Midnight (written in 1912, first staged in 1917), the Gas Trilogy (written between 1917-1920)
- Ernst Toller: Transformation (premiered in 1919), Man and the Masses (written in 1920, first performed in 1923)
- Reinhard Sorge: The Beggar (first performed in 1912)
- Walter Hasenclever: The Son (premiered in 1914)
- Hans Henny Jahnn: Pastor Ephraim Magnus (first staged in 1917), Coronation of Richard III (first premiered in 1922)
- Arnolt Bronnen: Parricide (first performance in 1922), Bird of Youth (premiered in 1922)
- Eugene O'Neill: The Hairy Ape (first performed in 1922), The Emperor Jones (first staged in 1920), The Great God Brown (premiered in 1922)
- Sophie Treadwell: Machinal (first premiered in 1928), O Nightingale (first performed in 1925)
- Elmer Rice: The Adding Machine (premiered in 1927), Street Scene (first opened in 1929)
- Lajos Egri: Rapid Transit (first premiered in 1923), Believe Me or Not (first staged in 1933)

== See also ==
- Expressionist plays
- Neue Sachlichkeit
- Epic theatre
- Theatre of Cruelty
