= Montevideo Planetarium =

Planetarium

Coordinates: 34°54′07″S 56°08′40″W

Planetario de Montevideo in 2017

The Montevideo Planetarium; officially known as the Surveyor Germán Barbato Municipal Planetarium, is a planetarium in Montevideo, Uruguay.

Inaugurated on 11 February 1955, it was the first planetarium in Latin America and all of the southern hemisphere. It has a 18.3 m diameter dome and seats 157 people.

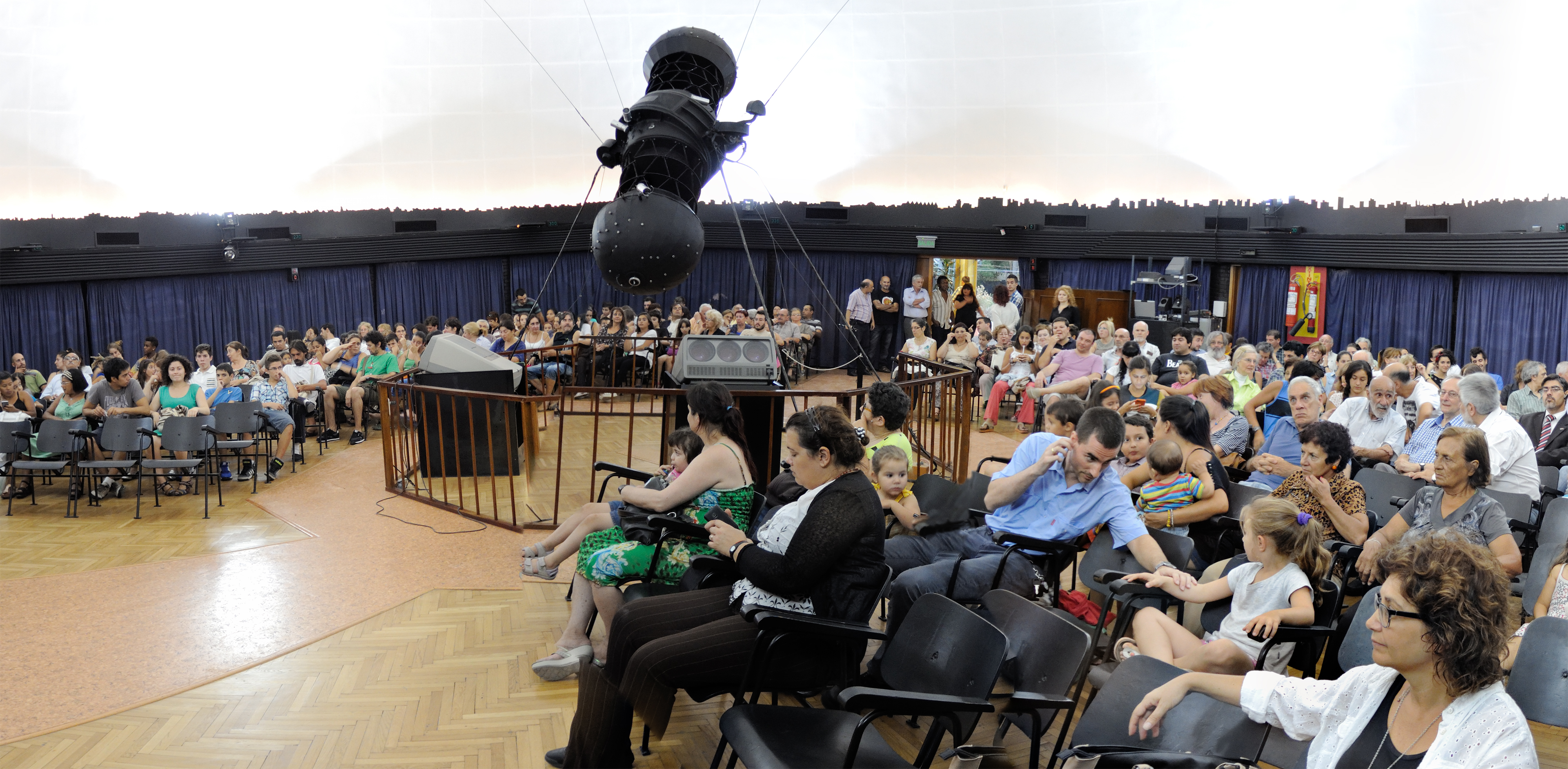
Interior in 2015, showing the old Spitz projector

Historically, it used a Spitz Model B projector, which in 2016 was the oldest such projector still in working order. The planetarium was renovated in 2017–19, when the Spitz projector was replaced by a digital system; it reopened in December 2019.
