= Rudolf Straubel =

German scientist and manager (1864–1943)

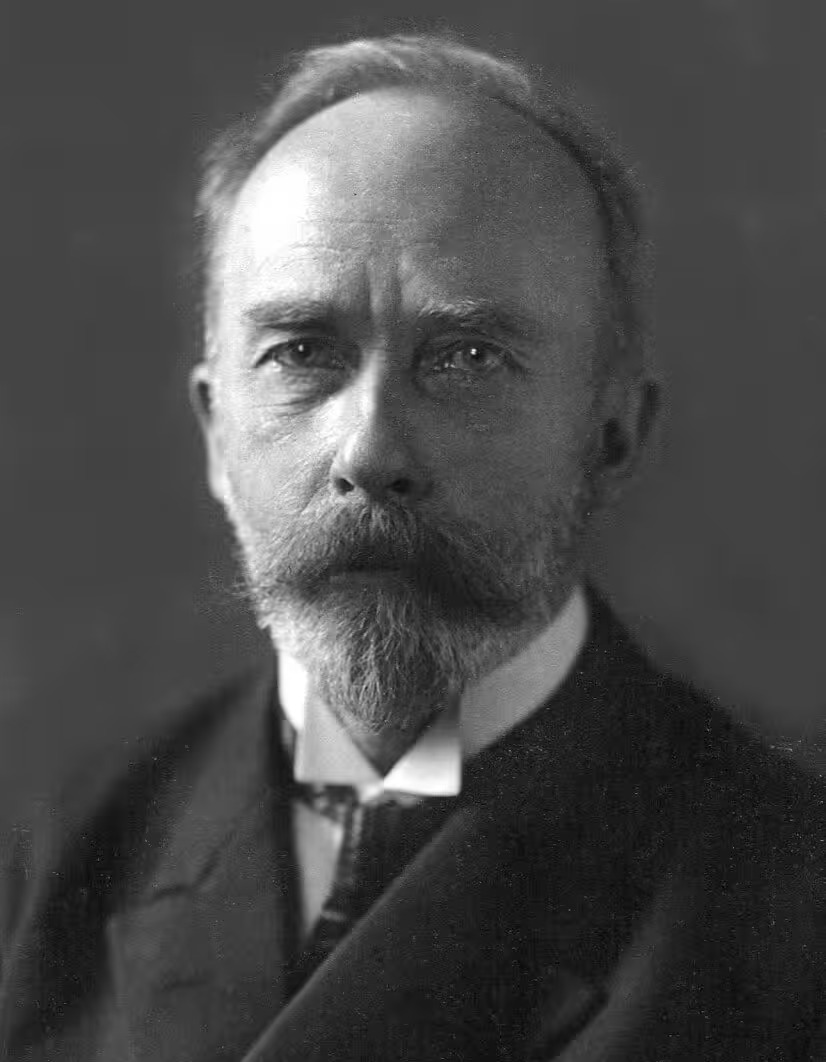
Rudolf Straubel about 1920, Foto: Familienarchiv Linda Langer Snook, Norman, USA

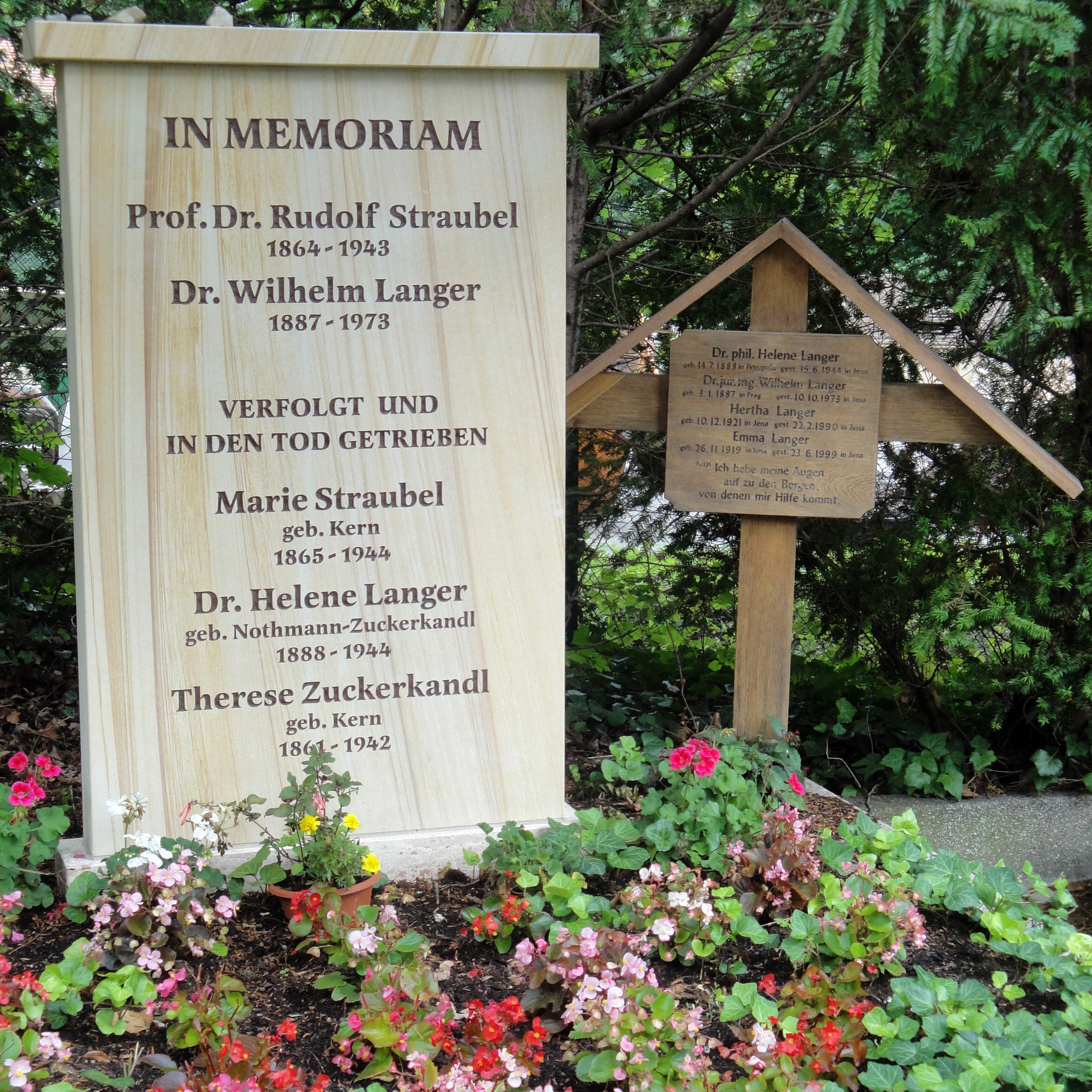
Tomb of Rudolf Straubel at North Cemetery in Jena

Rudolf Straubel (June 16, 1864 – December 2, 1943) was a German physicist, scientist, top-manager, inventor and sponsor of community. He was the successor to Ernst Abbe and managing director of Carl Zeiss in Jena from 1903 to 1933.

== Early life and education ==
Rudolf Straubel was born in 1864 as the son of pastor Carl Julius Straubel and his wife Emilie Natalie née Sterzing in Kleinschmalkalden. He had four siblings. He spent his childhood and school in Schönau vor dem Walde (Thuringian Forest). From 1876 to 1882 he attended the Ernestinum in Gotha, and in 1884 he graduated from the 'Gymnasium Casimirianum Coburg' in Coburg (upper Franconia).

After graduating from high school, he initially served as a one-year volunteer in the Jena Royal Fusilier Battalion. His main subjects at university were mathematics and physics. His teachers at the University of Jena included Ernst Abbe and Gottlob Frege. From 1885 to 1886, Straubel studied in Berlin under Weierstrass, Kronecker and Helmholtz. In 1886 he continued his studies in Jena and completed them in 1888 with a dissertation entitled "On the calculation of Fraunhofer's diffraction phenomena with special consideration of the theory of diffraction in the heliometer". Ernst Abbe had inspired him to write this topic.

== Career ==
In April 1889, Straubel took on an assistant position at the University of Jena. In 1893 he qualified as a professor: “Theory of the diffraction phenomena of circular, non-spherical waves”. In 1997, Straubel was appointed associate professor.

One of the consequences of the "German Geographers' Day" conference held in Jena in 1897 was the establishment of a "seismic station" under the direction of Straubel. Straubel improved seismometers with optical recording. Straubel remained head of the seismological station in Schillergäßchen until 1919. The successor to the Jena Seismic Institute was Oskar Hecker.

In 1903, Straubel became one of the managing directors of Zeiss and Schott, succeeding Ernst Abbe. Felix Jentsch wrote in 1934:

As a result of his high general intelligence and his many years of training in mathematics and physics, but above all as a result of his unusually quick comprehension, which enabled him to find his way around theoretically and practically in the most difficult questions, even if they were quite foreign to pure physics, in the shortest possible time, e.g. in the course of a conversation, Straubel was immediately given tasks that would not otherwise be required of a physics employee. It is characteristic of the circumstances at the time that, as he once told me, his first official task was to draw up an electricity supply contract with the Jena electricity company. Rudolf Straubel played a key role in expanding research and the success of Carl Zeiss in the first half of the 20th century.

He resigned in 1933 because he did not want to bow to the pressure of his colleagues in the Zeiss management (Henrichs, Kotthaus, Bauersfeld) and the National Socialists (in the form of Gauleiter Fritz Wächtler) to separate from his Jewish wife Marie Straubel, with whom he had four sons.

In 1903, Oskar von Miller decided to set up a "German Museum of Masterpieces of Science and Technology" in Munich. A connection was sought with Carl Zeiss Jena for a reflector and a refractor telescope (delivered in 1908 and 1909 respectively) and Siegfried Czapski was elected to the board of the German Museum. After Czapski's death in 1907, Straubel became a member of the board of the German Museum from 1912 to 1920. In 1913, Straubel promised to support the construction of the planetariums (a Copercanic and a Ptolemaic planetarium were planned). The projection planetarium was completed in Jena in 1924 and opened in Munich in 1925.

The foundation's operations used a coal-fired power plant on the southern part of the glassworks, but the associated air pollution hindered optical and precision engineering production. In 1912, an AEG generator was constructed as a 10 kV machine for the Burgau hydroelectric power plant. Autumn 1917. Straubel founded the Hydrotechnical Office (Hydro Office) for the design and construction of hydroelectric power plants. Chief engineer Hans Leicher and engineer Peter, both Swiss citizens, were hired for this purpose. - They returned to their homeland in 1924."

Straubel is considered the "father of the Saale Dams".

After the death of Czapki in 1907, Straubel was appointed managing director of the Schott & Gen. glassworks. He thus held a dual role as managing director of both Jena foundation companies.

In 1902, Zeiss took over the Jena-based “Palmos Kamera-Werk AG”. In 1909, the “Ica AG” (internationale Camera Aktiengesellschaft) was founded with headquarters in Dresden. Straubel remained on the supervisory board until his death in 1943.

The Thuringian Minister of the Interior and Education Wächtler aimed for "a reform of the Marxist and liberalist-tainted Zeiss factory from head to toe" (translated from German). Straubel resigned from his position in the foundation's operations on September 30, 1933. Until 1938, his lectures at the University of Jena were shown in the lecture list, then, on orders from Weimar, they were no longer shown. Straubel was "related to Jews"

== Personal life ==
At a meeting in the house of Felix Auerbach he met Marie Kern, the daughter of a Jewish industrialist and banker from Silesia. They married in Berlin in 1894. In 1902 Marie became the first chairwoman of the Jena branch of the "Women's Education - Women's Studies" association. She committed suicide in 1944 after receiving a summons to be transported to Theresienstadt. Her husband had died of pancreatic cancer on December 2, 1943. Her sister Therese had already committed suicide before she could be deported to Theresienstadt. She had difficulty walking, which was a main reason why Straubel did not leave Germany with his family. They had four children. Heinrich (Heinz) (1895–1970), Werner (1857–1945), Wolfgang (1899–1919) and Harald (1905–1991).

== Legacy ==
In February 2022, a lecture hall in the Abbeanum (lecture hall at university of Jena) was named after him. A street in the southern quarter of Jena was named after him. In 2015, the tomb Straubel-Langer-Zuckerkandl was re-inaugurated at the Jena North Cemetery. In 1924, he became an honorary member of the German Physical Society. In 1930, he became a member of the Leopoldina.

== Publications ==
- H. Boegehold: Rudolf Straubel zum 70. Geburtstag. In: Die Naturwissenschaften, 22. Jahrgang 1934, S. 421–424.
- Maximilian Herzberger: The Scientific Work of Constantin Rudolf Straubel. In: Journal of the Optical Society of America, 44. Jahrgang 1954, S. 589–591.
- F. Jentzsch: Rudolf Straubel zum 70. Geburtstag. In: Zeitschrift für Technische Physik, Jahrgang 1934, Nr. 6.
- Peter Volz: Tracing paths of history. Rudolf Straubel, Walter Bauersfeld and the projection planetarium. In: Planetarian, 42. Jahrgang 2013, Nr. 4 / 43. Jahrgang 2014, Nr. 1.
- Reinhard E. Schielicke: Rudolf Straubel 1864–1943. Verlag Vopelius, Jena 2017.
- Jenaer Jahrbuch zur Technik- und Industriegeschichte, Band 24, Verlag Volpelius Jena, 2021
- Reinhard E. Schielicke, Peter Bussemer: Mehr als nur der dritte Mann, Physik Journal 23, Nr. 12, S. 44–47, WILEY-VCH, Weinheim, 2024
