= Eidouranion =

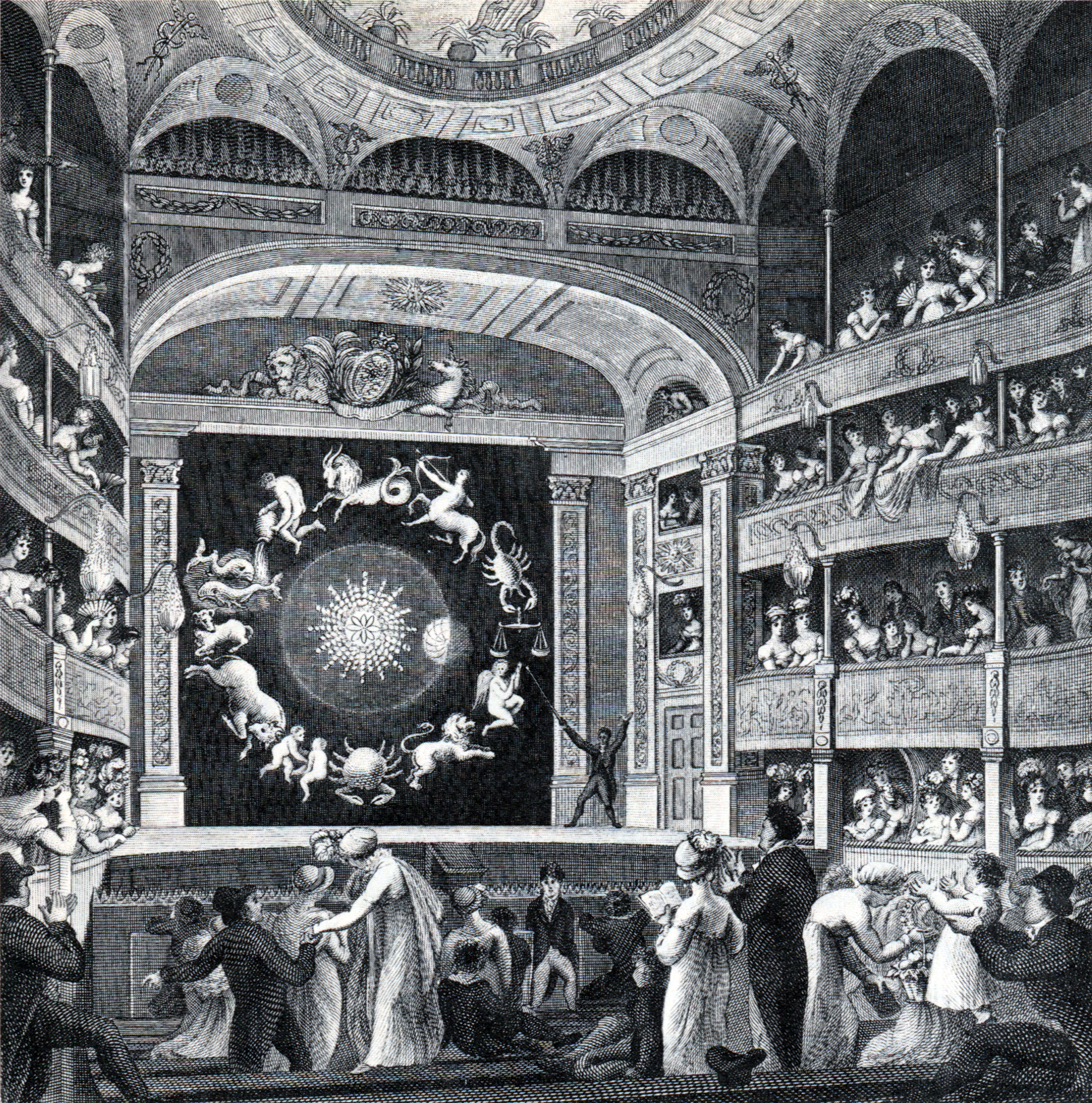
Proscenium of the English Opera House, Strand, 21 March 1817, with Walker's exhibition of the Eidouranion.

An eidouranion is a kind of orrery that combined mechanical movement with a method of back projection. Its invention is attributed to Adam Walker (1731–1821) who in the 1780s built one measuring 27 ft (8.2 m) in diameter. He used it to accompany his lectures on astronomy. It is an ancestor of planetarium projectors.

It is known that Adam Walker held lectures featuring the Eidouranium at the Royal Theatre in London in the 1780s and the London Lyceum. The shows were continued by his eldest son, William Walker (1767-1816), from around 1812. The shows were continued through the 1820s by William’s younger brother Deane Franklin Walker (1778-1865).

The word "eidouranion" derives from the Greek compound "eid + ouranos". The combining elements are "eidos", which means "what is seen, shape, form", and "ouranos", which was the name of the god of the heavens. Thus, the combined form means "shaped like the heavens" or "formed like the heavens".
