= Adam Walker (inventor) =

English writer & inventor (1730/31–1821)

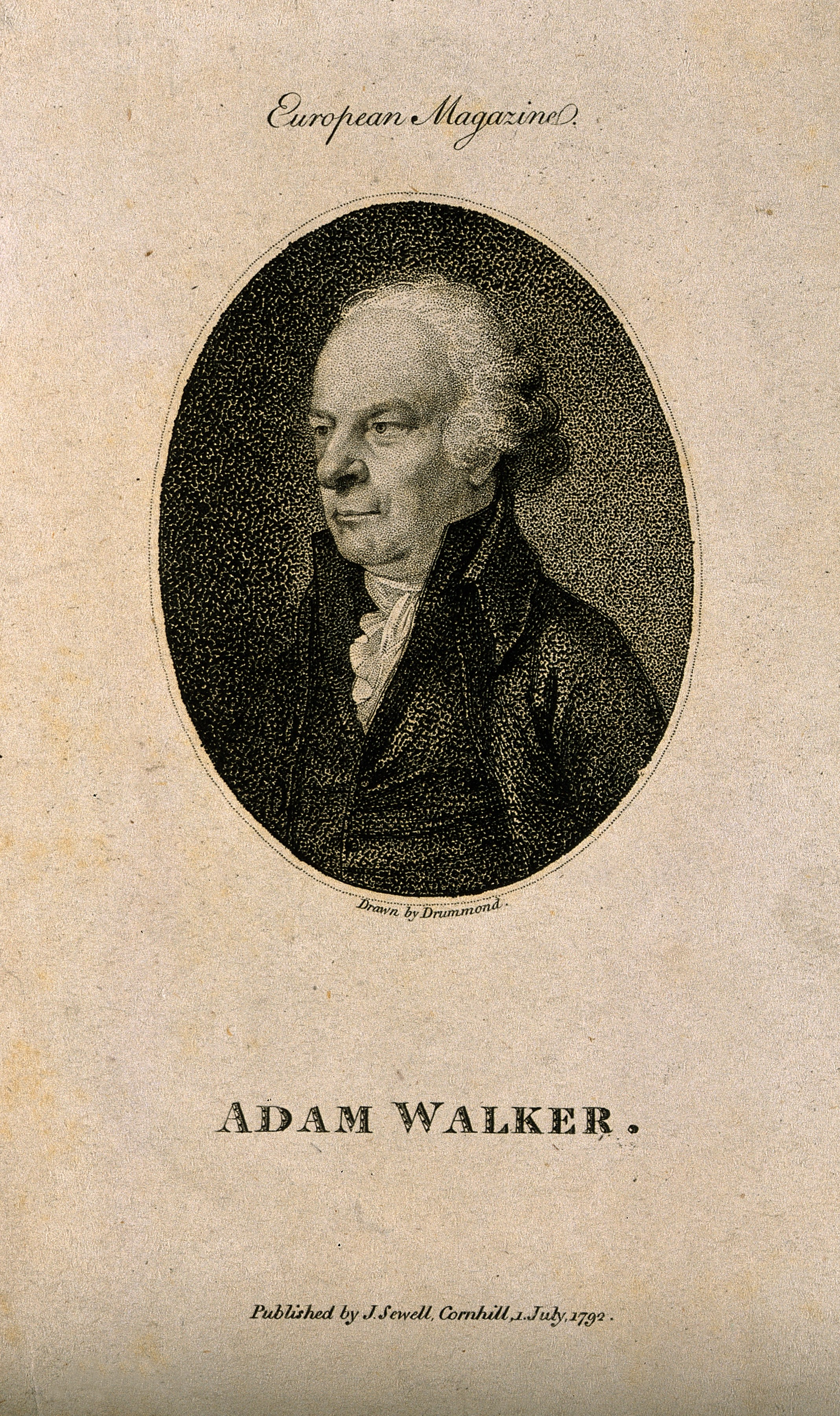
- Born: 1730/1731
- Died: 11 February 1821
- Known for: Invention of the eidouranion

Adam Walker (1730/31 – 11 February 1821) was an English writer and inventor. He gave lectures on astronomy, aided by one of his inventions, the eidouranion.

== Life ==
Walker was born in Patterdale in Westmorland, the son of a woollen manufacturer. He left school almost before he could read, but continued to study on his own. He borrowed books, and occupied his leisure in constructing models of neighbouring corn mills, paper mills and fulling mills. His reputation as a student at the age of fifteen procured him the post of usher at Ledsham school in the West Riding of Yorkshire.

Three years later he was appointed writing-master and accountant at the Free School in Macclesfield, where he studied mathematics and produced his first publication, A System of Family Bookkeeping, with a Ready Ruled Book (1758). He also made some ventures in trade which were unsuccessful, and lectured on astronomy in Manchester. The success of his lectures encouraged him, after four years at Macclesfield, to set up a school in Manchester in 1762 on his own account. This, however, he gave up in 1766 for the purpose of travelling as a lecturer in natural philosophy, and, after visiting many towns in northern England and southern Scotland, and spending four years in Ireland, he met Joseph Priestley, who induced him to lecture in the Theatre Royal in Haymarket in 1778. Meeting with success, he took a house in George Street, Hanover Square, and gave lectures every winter to numerous audiences. He was engaged as lecturer by the provost of Eton College, Edward Barnard, whose example was followed by the heads of Westminster, Winchester, and other public schools.

=== Inventions ===
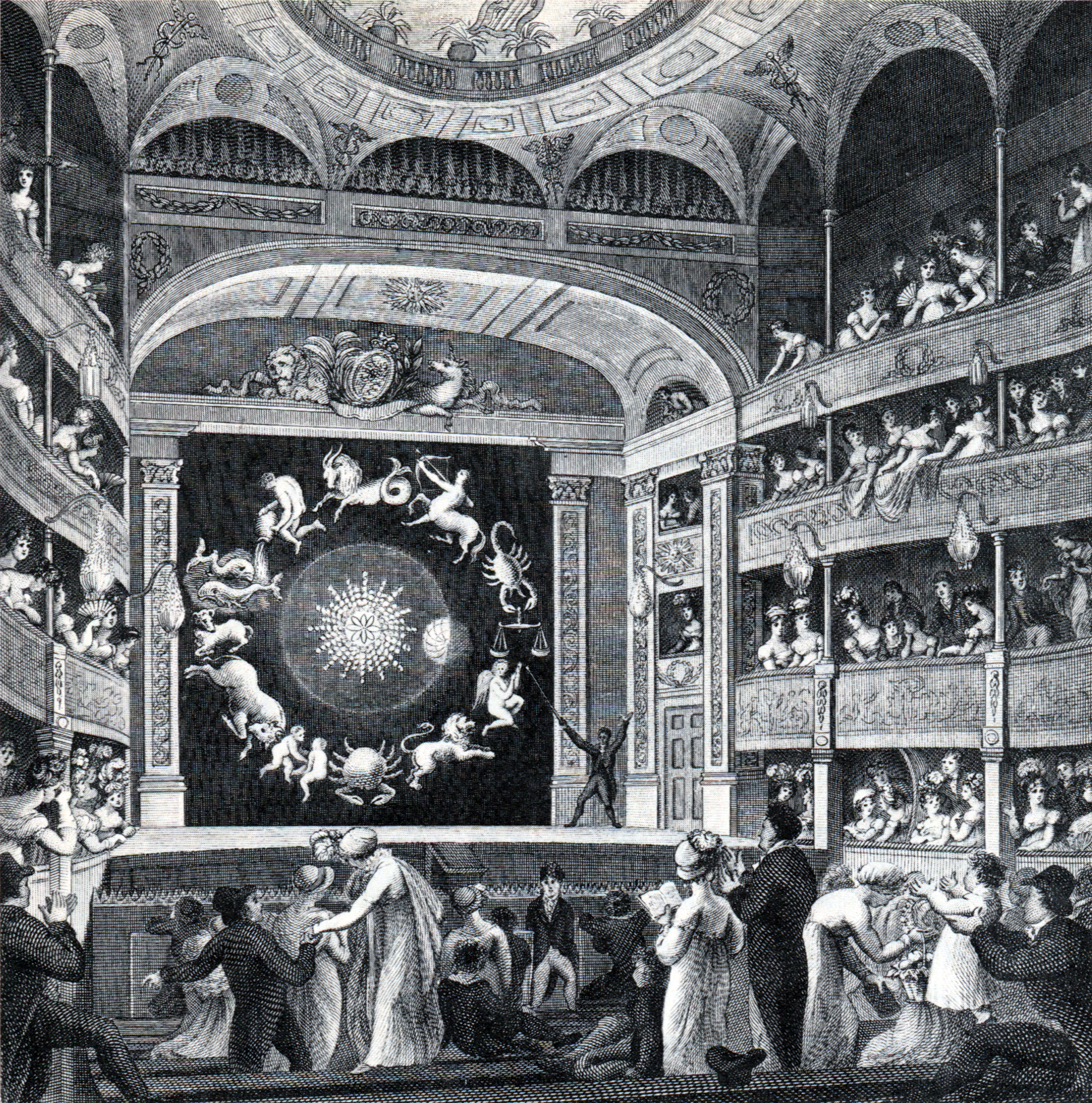
Walker at the English Opera House exhibiting the Eidouranion. By Edward Francis Burney (1817).

Walker amused his leisure by perfecting various mechanical inventions. Among others he devised engines for raising water, carriages to go by wind and steam, a road mill, a machine for watering land, and a dibbling plough. He also planned the rotatory lights on the Scilly Isles, erected on St Agnes' Island in 1790 under his supervision. On 29 July 1772 he took out a patent (No. 1020) for an improved harpsichord, called the "Cœlestina" which was capable of producing continuous tones. On 21 February 1786, by another patent (No. 1533), he introduced a method of thermo-ventilation, on lines formerly proposed by Samuel Sutton, on 16 March 1744 (patent No. 602), with whose ideas, however, Walker was unacquainted. He proposed to ventilate as well as heat a house without expense by means of a kitchen fire. His method, though economically fallacious, was not without ingenuity.

Walker also constructed an "eidouranion", or transparent orrery, which he used to illustrate his astronomical lectures. These were published in pamphlet form, under the title An Epitome of Astronomy, and reached a twenty-sixth edition in 1817.

Walker died in Richmond, Surrey on 11 February 1821, and was buried in the family vault in Hayes, Middlesex.

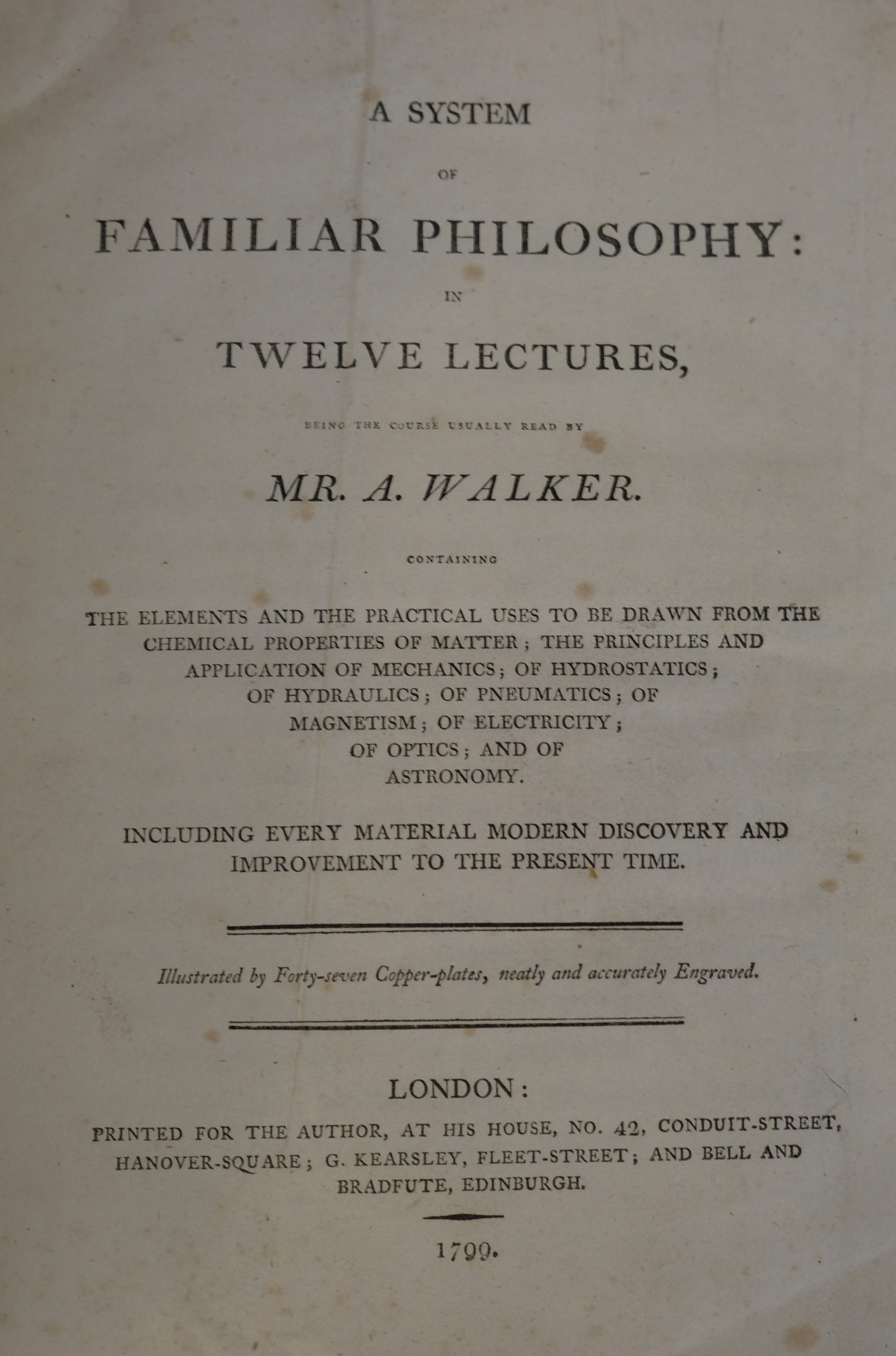
Title page to A System of Familiar Philosophy (1799)

== Works ==
His chief works were:

1. Analysis of Course of Lectures on Natural and Experimental Philosophy (2nd edition 1771, 12th edition 1802).
2. A Philosophical Estimate of the Causes, Effect, and Cure of Unwholesome Air in large Cities (1777).
3. Ideas suggested on the spot in a late Excursion through Flanders, Germany, France, and Italy (1790).
4. Remarks made in a Tour from London to the Lakes of Westmoreland and Cumberland (1792).
5. A System of Familiar Philosophy (1799, new edition 1802), 2 vols.

He was the author of several articles in the Philosophical Magazine and in Arthur Young's Annals of Agriculture.

== Family ==
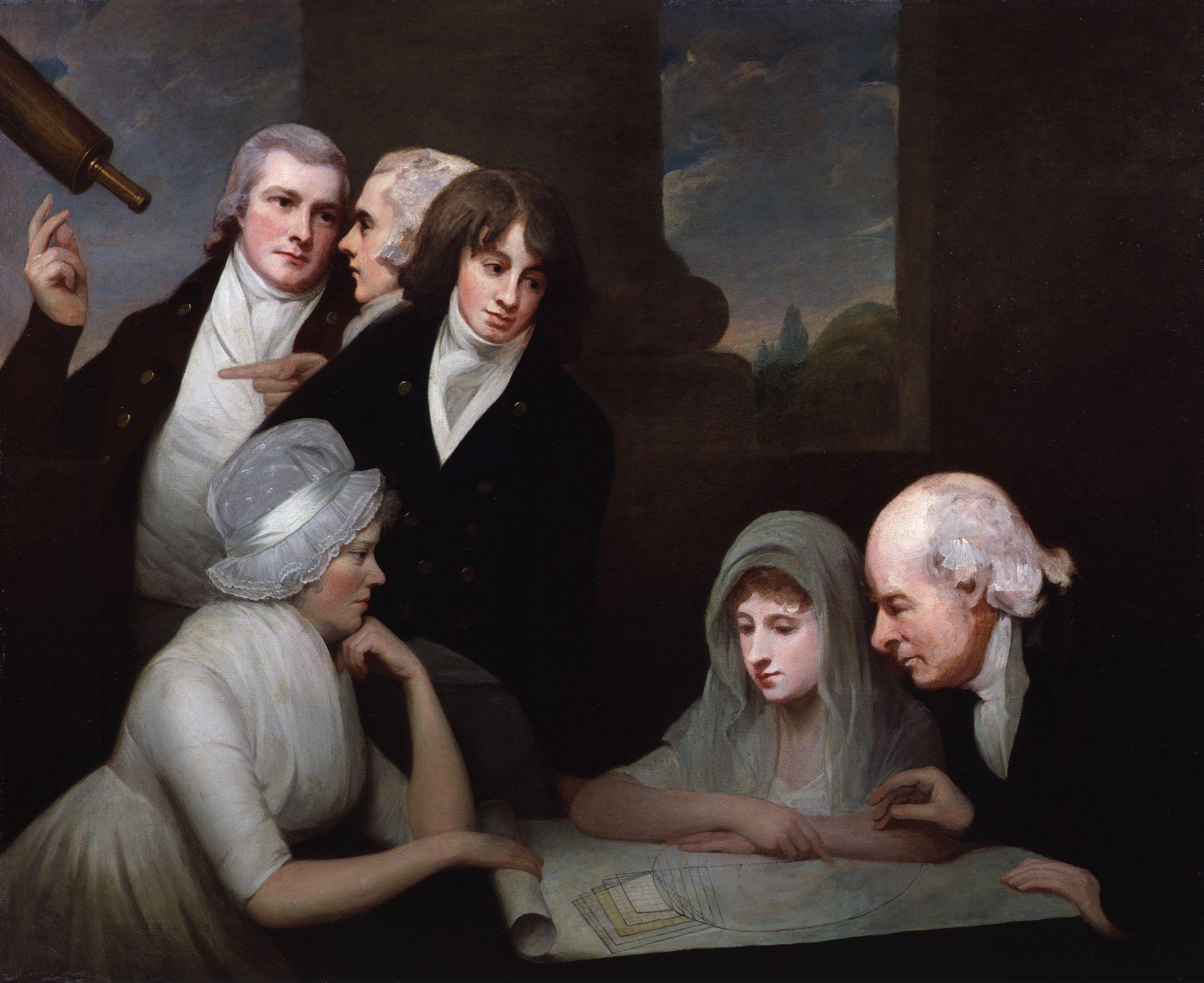
Adam Walker and his family, by George Romney

Walker had three sons: William (1767–1816), who assisted his father in his astronomical lectures; Adam John, Rector of Bedston in Shropshire; and Deane Franklin (1778–1865), who, after the death of his brother William, continued his father's lectures at Eton, Harrow, and Rugby, as well as his popular discourses in London; and a daughter, Eliza (died 1856), who was married to Benjamin Gibson of Gosport, Hampshire.
