= Kerala Science and Technology Museum =

Museum in Kerala, India

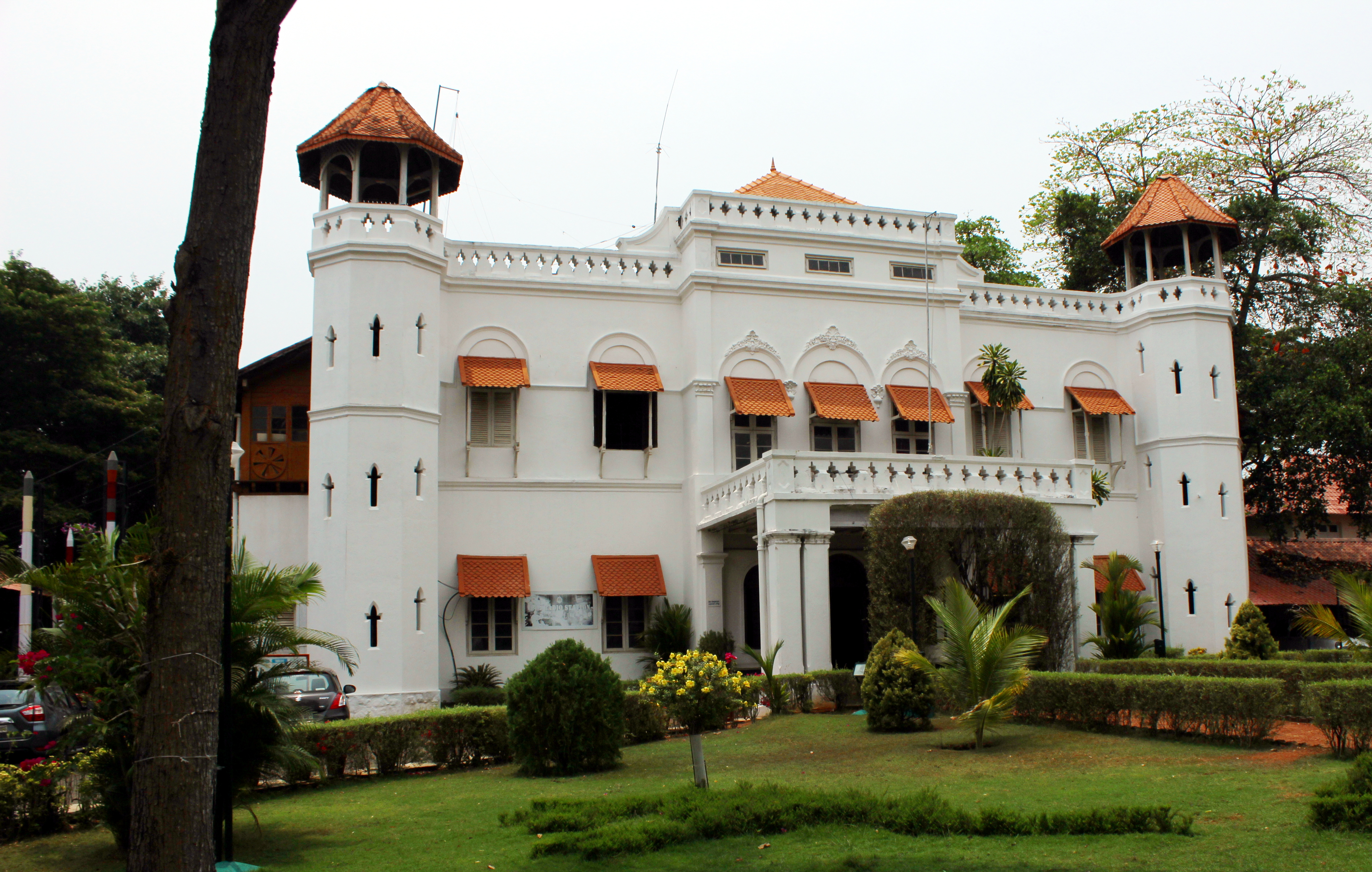
- The main building of Kerala Science and Technology Museum

- Location within Thiruvananthapuram
- Established: 1984
- Location: PMG Junction, Vikas Bhavan P.O., Thiruvananthapuram
- Coordinates: 8.509978°N 76.946070°E
- Director: Soju S S
- Website: www.kstmuseum.com

Kerala Science and Technology Museum is an autonomous institution established by Government of Kerala, India, in 1984, as a center for popularisation of science and scientific temper among the general public, especially among the young generation. The institution is in the heart of Thiruvananthapuram city, in Kerala. The Priyadarsini Planetarium is attached to the museum, functioning since 1994.

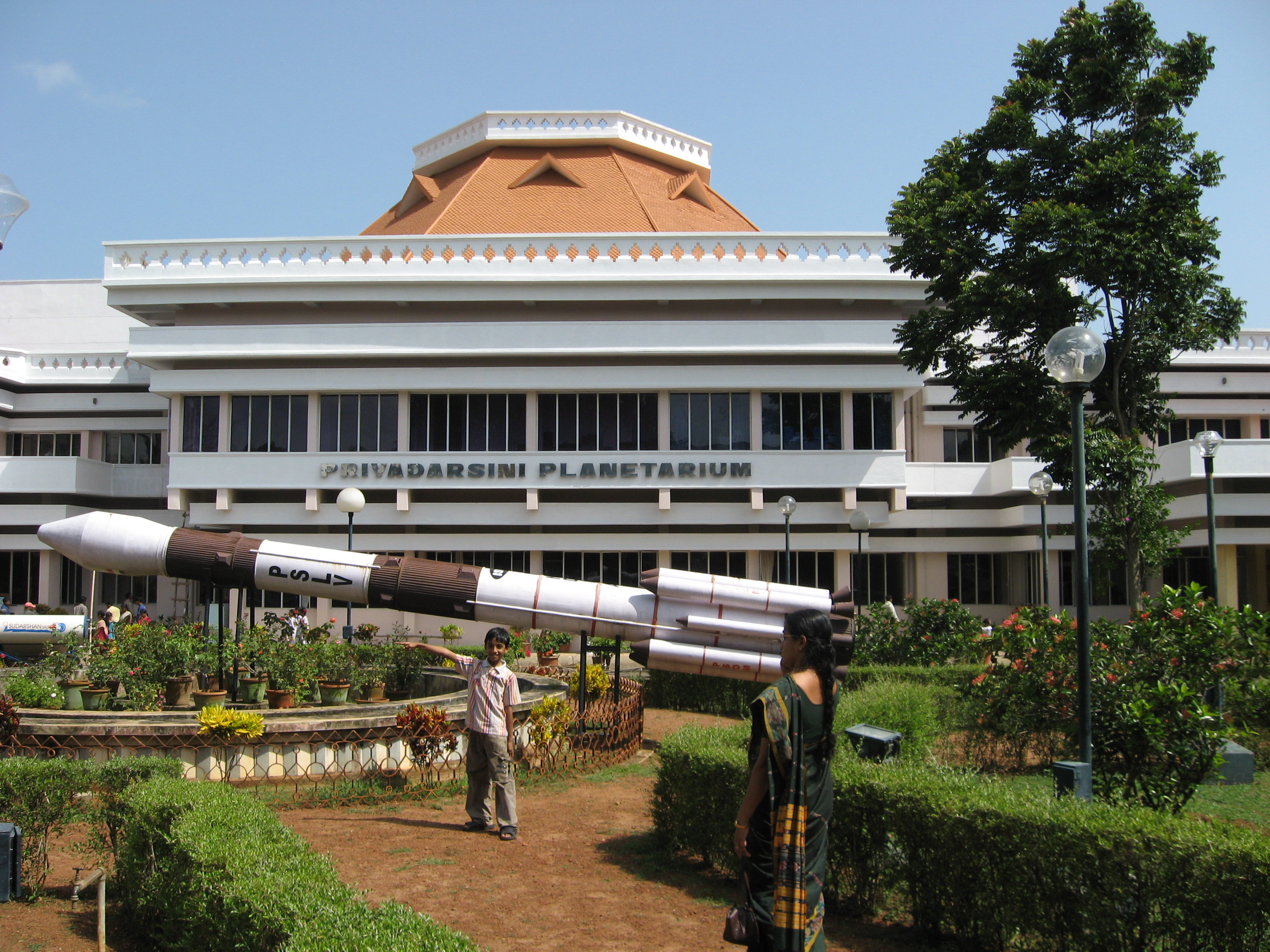
Priyadarshini Planetarium attached with Museum

== See also ==
- Astrotourism in India
- List of planetariums
- List of science centers#Asia
